= Lexus LS =

Full-size luxury sedan series produced by Lexus

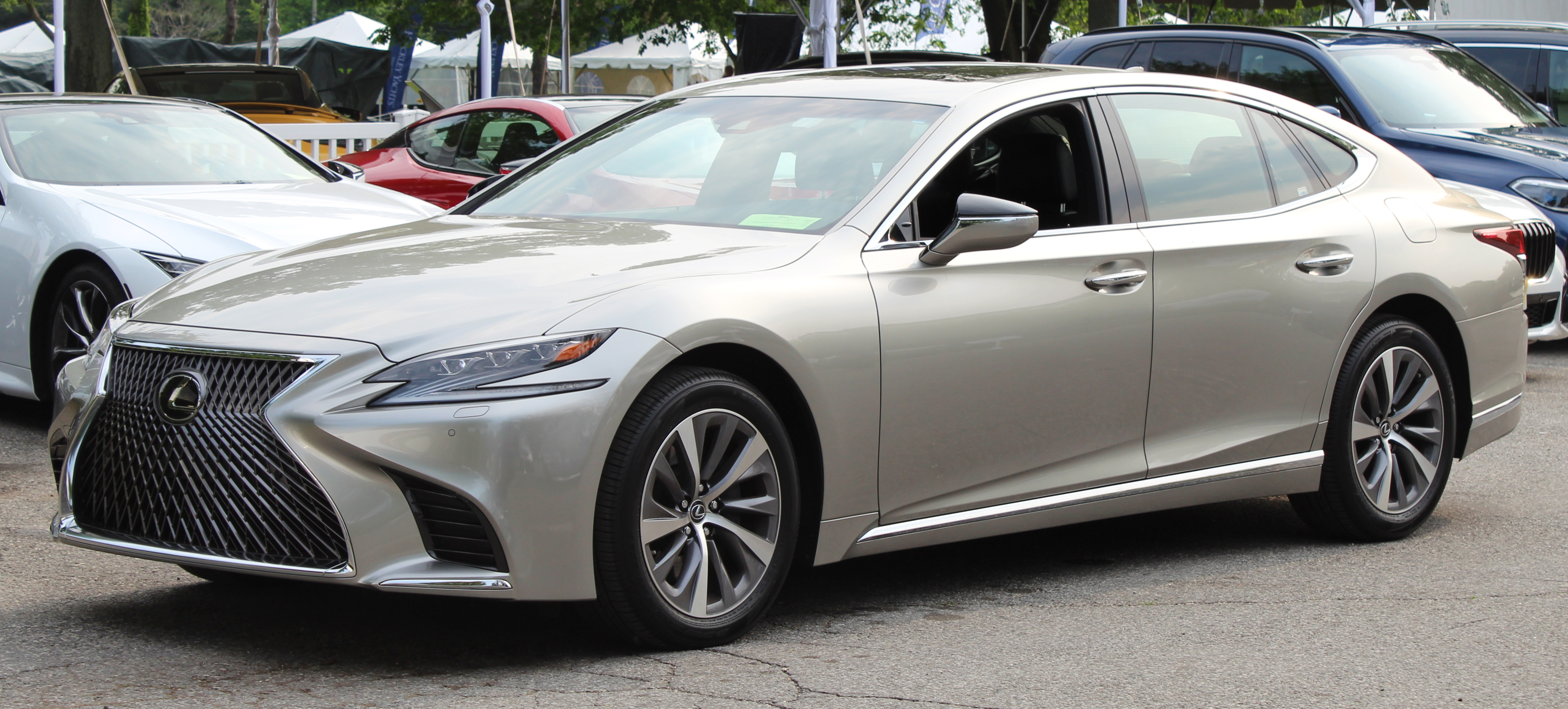
- 2019 Lexus LS 500 AWD (VXFA55, US)

Overview
- Manufacturer: Toyota
- Also called: Toyota Celsior (Japan, 1989–2006)
- Production: May 1989 – present
- Model years: 1990–2026 (North America)
- Assembly: Japan: Tahara, Aichi (Tahara plant)

Body and chassis
- Class: Full-size luxury car (F)
- Body style: 4-door saloon
- Layout: Front-engine, rear-wheel-drive; Front-engine, all-wheel-drive (since 2006)

The Lexus LS (Japanese: レクサス・LS, Hepburn: Rekusasu LS) is a series of full-size luxury sedans that have served as the flagship model of Lexus, the luxury division of Toyota, since 1989. For the first four generations, all LS models featured V8 engines and were predominantly rear-wheel-drive. In the fourth generation, Lexus offered all-wheel-drive, hybrid, and long-wheelbase variants. The fifth generation changed to using a V6 engine with no V8 option, and only one length was offered.

As the first model developed by Lexus, the LS 400 debuted in January 1989 with the second generation debuting in November 1994. The LS 430 debuted in January 2000 and the LS 460/LS 460 L series in 2006. A domestic-market version of the LS 400 and LS 430, badged as the Toyota Celsior (Japanese: トヨタ・セルシオ, Hepburn: Toyota Serushio), was sold in Japan until the Lexus marque was introduced there in 2006. In 2006 (for the 2007 model year), the fourth generation LS 460 debuted the first production eight-speed automatic transmission and an automatic parking system. In 2007, V8 hybrid powertrains were introduced on the LS 600h/LS 600h L sedans.

Development of the LS began in 1983 as the F1 project, the code name for a secret flagship sedan. At the time, Toyota's two existing flagship models were the Crown and Century models – both of which catered exclusively for the Japanese market and had little global appeal that could compete with international luxury brands such as Mercedes-Benz, BMW and Jaguar. The resulting sedan followed an extended five-year design process at a cost of over US$1 billion and premiered with a new V8 engine and numerous luxury features. The Lexus LS was intended from its inception for export markets, and the Lexus division was formed to market and service the vehicle internationally. The original LS 400 debuted to strong sales and was largely responsible for the successful launch of the Lexus marque.

Since the start of production, each generation of the Lexus LS has been manufactured in the Japanese city of Tahara, Aichi. The name "LS" stands for "Luxury Sedan", although some Lexus importers have preferred to define it as "Luxury Saloon". The name "Celsior" is taken from Latin word "celsus", meaning "lofty" or "elevated".

== First generation (XF10; 1989) ==
First generation
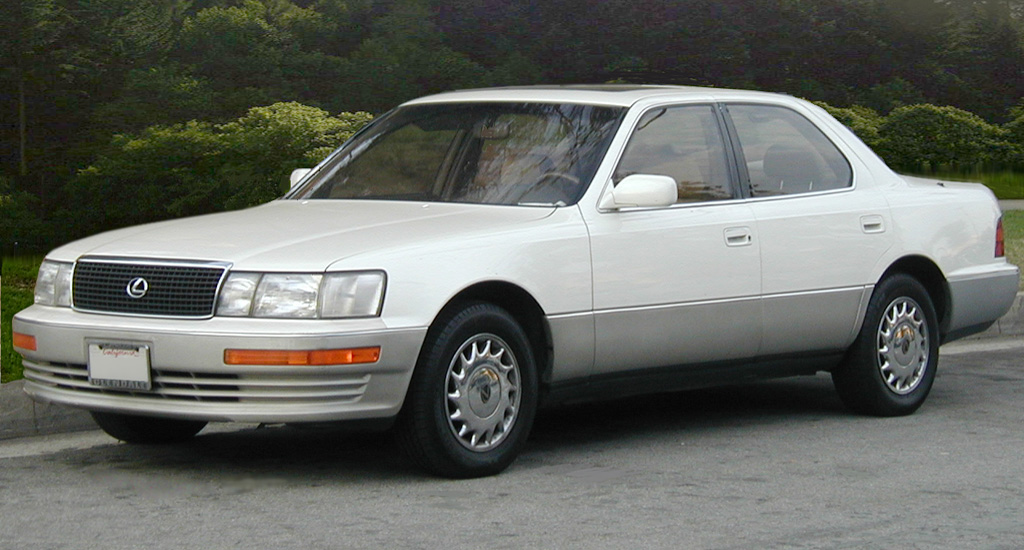
- Lexus LS 400 (UCF10)

Overview
- Model code: XF10
- Also called: Toyota Celsior (Japan)
- Production: May 1989 – September 1994
- Model years: 1990–1994
- Designer: Kunihiro Uchida (Chief Exterior); Michikazu Masu (Interior); Masahiko Kawatsu (Parts); Akihiro Nagaya (Parts)

Body and chassis
- Layout: Front-engine, rear-wheel-drive

Powertrain
- Engine: 3,968 cc (242 cu in) 1UZ-FE V8
- Power output: 186 kW (250 hp)
- Transmission: 4-speed A341E automatic

Dimensions
- Wheelbase: 2,814 mm (110.8 in)
- Length: 4,996 mm (196.7 in)
- Width: 1,821–1,829 mm (71.7–72.0 in)
- Height: 1,405–1,415 mm (55.3–55.7 in)
- Curb weight: 1,705–1,750 kg (3,759–3,858 lb)

=== 1989–1992 ===
In August 1983, Toyota chairman Eiji Toyoda initiated the F1 project ("Flagship" and "No. 1" vehicle; alternatively called the "Circle-F" project), as a clandestine effort aimed at producing a world-class luxury sedan for international markets. The F1 development effort did not have a specific budget or time constraints, and the resulting vehicle did not use existing Toyota platforms or parts. Instead, chief engineer Ichiro Suzuki sought to develop an all-new design, aiming to surpass rival American and European flagship sedans in specific target areas, including aerodynamics, cabin quietness, overall top speed, and fuel efficiency. During development, the 60 designers with 1,400 engineers in 24 teams, 2,300 technicians and over 200 support workers built approximately 450 flagship prototypes and 900 engine prototypes. The teams logged 2.7 million kilometres (1.7 million miles) of testing on locations ranging from winter Europe roadways to deserts in Arizona, Australia, or Saudi Arabia, to American highways and wilderness.

An early Lexus LS design sketch

In May 1985, designers started work on the F1 project. In late 1985, designers presented the first exterior study models to F1 management, featuring a sports car-like design with a low-slung bonnet and narrow front profile. By 1986, the sedan used a three-box design with an upright stance, more prominent grille, and a two-tone body. Extensive modeling and wind tunnel tests resulted in a low drag coefficient for a conventional production vehicle of the time (C_{d} 0.29). For the passenger cabin, the materials-selection tests evaluated 24 different kinds of wood and multiple types of leather for two years before settling on specific trim combinations. By 1986, the Lexus marque was created to support the launch of the flagship sedan, and the vehicle became known as the Lexus LS. Following eight design reviews, subsequent revisions, concept approval in February 1987, and over US$1 billion in development expenses, the final design for the production Lexus LS 400 (chassis code UCF10) was frozen in May 1987 with design patents filed on 20 February 1987 and 13 May 1987.

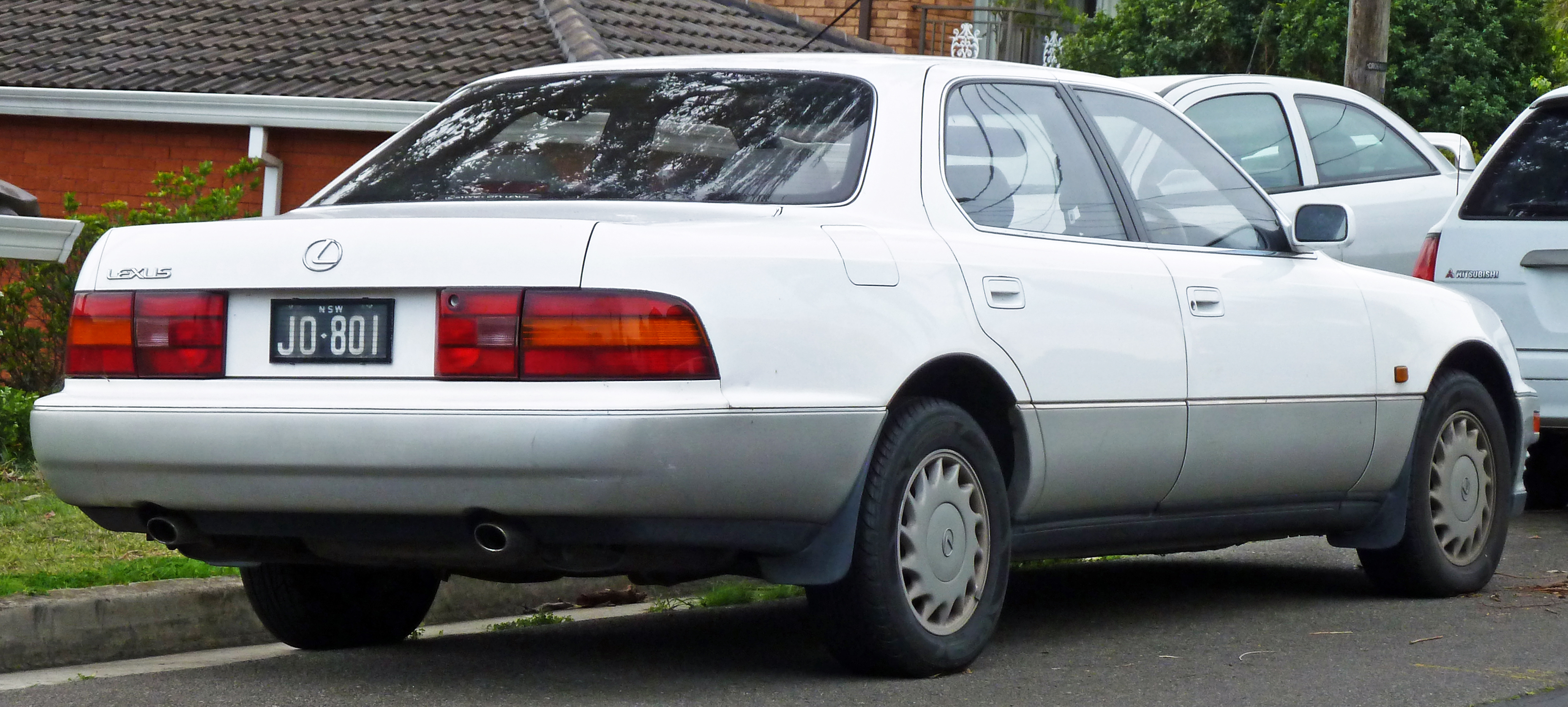
1990–1992 Lexus LS 400 (UCF10R; Australia)

In January 1989, the LS 400 made its debut as a 1990 model at the North American International Auto Show, in Detroit, Michigan. Production began on 15 May 1989, with the first shipments leaving Japanese ports in late June 1989. The first cars were available in August 1989, and U.S. sales officially began on 1 September 1989, followed by limited exports to Australia, Canada, and the United Kingdom starting in 1990. Sales in certain, lesser markets only started in late 1991, nearly three years after the car's introduction, as Lexus chose to focus on the North American and home markets. Production was limited to about 50,000 cars per year in order to maintain desired quality standards; 40,000 of these were earmarked for the United States, 8,000 for Japan, and only about 2,000 examples for the rest of the world.

The LS 400's new 4.0-litre 1UZ-FE 32-valve V8 engine, capable of 245 PS (180 kW; 242 hp) and 350 N⋅m (258 lb⋅ft) of torque, was linked to a new four-speed automatic transmission with ECT-i electronically controlled shifts, super-flow torque converter and rear differential. The chassis used an independent, high-mount upper arm double-wishbone suspension setup with twin tube shock absorbers, and a passive air suspension system was optional. The LS 400's 0–100 kilometres per hour (62 mph) time was 8.5 seconds, and its top speed was 250 km/h (155 mph). Compared to its rivals, namely the BMW 735i (E32) and Mercedes-Benz 420 SE (W126), the LS 400 had a quieter cabin, with 58 dB at 100 km/h (62 mph); a higher top speed; a lower drag coefficient and curb weight; it also avoided the U.S. Gas Guzzler Tax. In European tests, the noise level at 200 km/h (124 mph) was measured at 74 dBA, equal to a BMW 735i at 150 km/h (93 mph). At its introduction in 1989, the Celsior won the Car of the Year Japan award.

The LS 400 was among the first luxury sedans to feature an automatic tilt-and-telescoping steering wheel with SRS airbag, power adjustable shoulder seat belts, and an electrochromic rear-view mirror. The five-passenger cabin included California walnut and leather trim, power-adjustable seats, and soft-touch controls. A back-lit electro-luminescent gauge cluster featured a holographic visual effect, with indicator lights projected onto the instrument panel. The memory system stored the driver's seat, side mirror, steering wheel, and seat belt positions. Available luxury options included a Nakamichi premium sound system and an integrated cellular telephone with hands-free capabilities. The LS 400 further contained some 300 technological innovations to aid smooth operation and silence, including fluid-damped cabin fixtures, vibration-insulating rubber mounts, airflow fairings, and sandwich steel body panels.

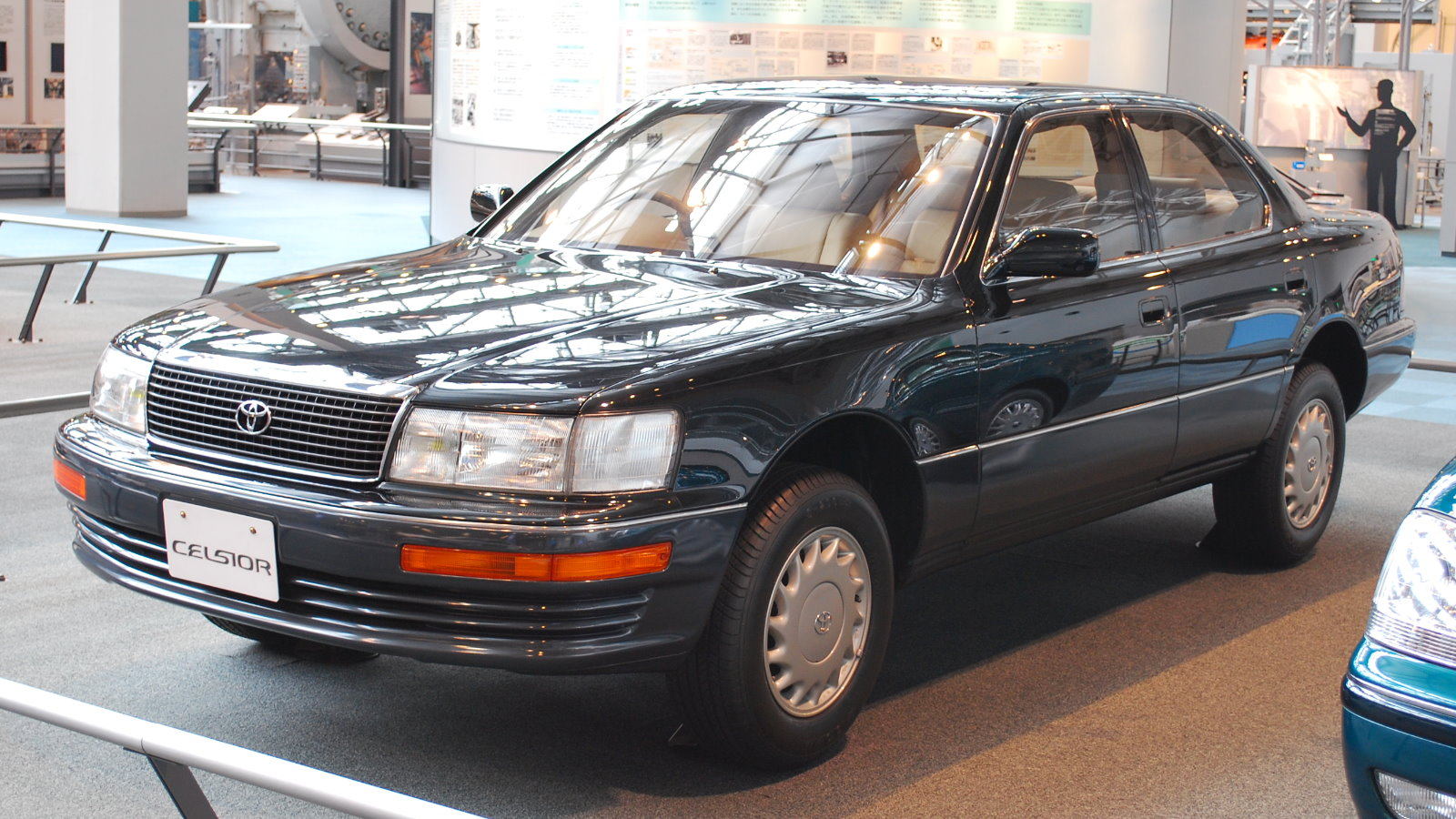
1989 Toyota Celsior

In Japan, the launch of Lexus was complicated by Toyota's existing four domestic dealership networks at the time of its introduction. The Toyota Crown and Toyota Century were exclusive to Toyota Store locations. During the LS 400's development, local dealers' requests for a Japanese domestic market version had grown, and a right-hand-drive Toyota Celsior-badged version was introduced shortly after the LS 400's U.S. debut, and introduced on 9 October 1989 and only available at Toyopet Store locations. The Celsior, named after the Latin word for "supreme", was largely identical to the LS. Models came in either basic "A", a "B" model with uprated suspension, or fully equipped "C" trim specifications. The Crown and the Crown Majesta, which appeared later in 1991, were only available at Toyota Store locations which carried Japan-only Toyota luxury models, like the Century. Ownership costs for Japanese drivers were and are expensive due to Japanese Government dimension regulations and annual road tax obligations. Owning a Celsior in Japan is also considered extravagant because urban two-way streets are usually zoned at 40 km/h (25 mph) or less. The Celsior introduced two world firsts: high-performance twin-tube shock absorbers and an air suspension combined with an upgraded version of Toyota's semi-active Toyota Electronic Modulated Suspension, called Piezo TEMS.

Adding incentive for early U.S. sales was a base price of US$35,000 ($90,906 in 2025 dollars), which undercut competitors by thousands of dollars and brought accusations of selling below cost from rival BMW. Being a flagship luxury sedan in the full-size segment, the relatively low starting MSRP was actually targeted to be at $25,000 during initial stages of development. However, the depreciation of the Yen vs. the Dollar resulted in a climb to $35,000. Lexus division general manager Dave Illingworth admitted in an interview with Automotive News that many in product planning were concerned about the price hike and the potential effect it could have on sales success. Part of the concern was because that the Lexus nameplate lacked the heritage and brand recognition of German rivals such as Mercedes-Benz. Similarly, luxury cars competing in a class slightly below that of the BMW 7-Series and Mercedes S-Class averaged in the $25000 range. However, once the LS400 was released, sales figures were very positive, as the vehicle was nearly universally praised for its high standards and levels of specification.

In Germany, the first Lexus didn't convince the motor journalists yet. In a comparison test by Auto Motor und Sport between the BMW 735i L, Lexus LS 400 and Mercedes-Benz 420 SEL, it finished last. Despite the highest marks for its power train, the Japanese opponent fell behind for bodywork, road holding and comfort.

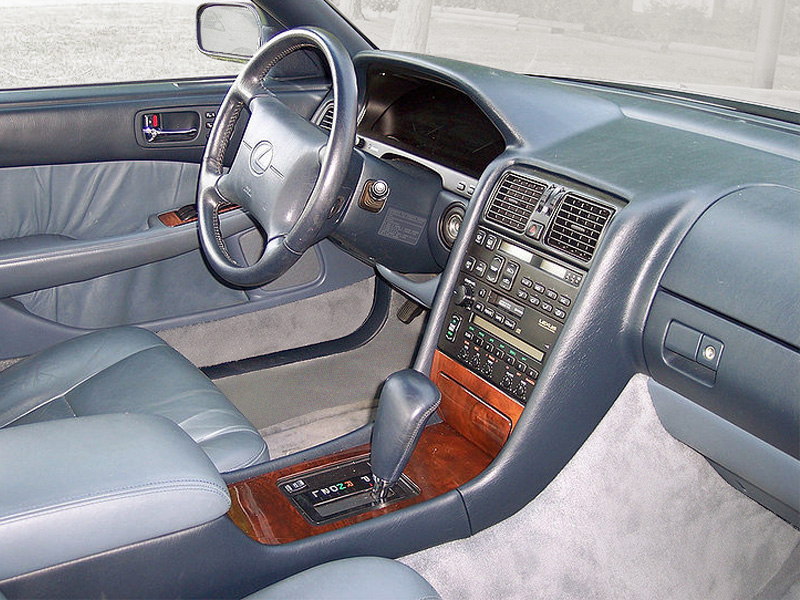
First-generation LS 400 cabin (UCF10 II)

In December 1989, shortly after the LS 400's launch, Lexus ordered a voluntary recall of the 8,000 vehicles sold so far, based upon two customer complaints over defective wiring and an overheated brake light. All vehicles were serviced within 20 days, and the incident helped establish Lexus' customer service reputation. By 1990, U.S. sales of the LS 400 had surpassed those of competing Mercedes-Benz, BMW, and Jaguar models. Production of the first-generation LS 400 totaled over 165,000 units. The LS 400 made Consumer Reports 2007 list of recommended vehicles that regularly last 320,000 km (200,000 mi) or more, with proper maintenance.

=== 1992–1994 ===
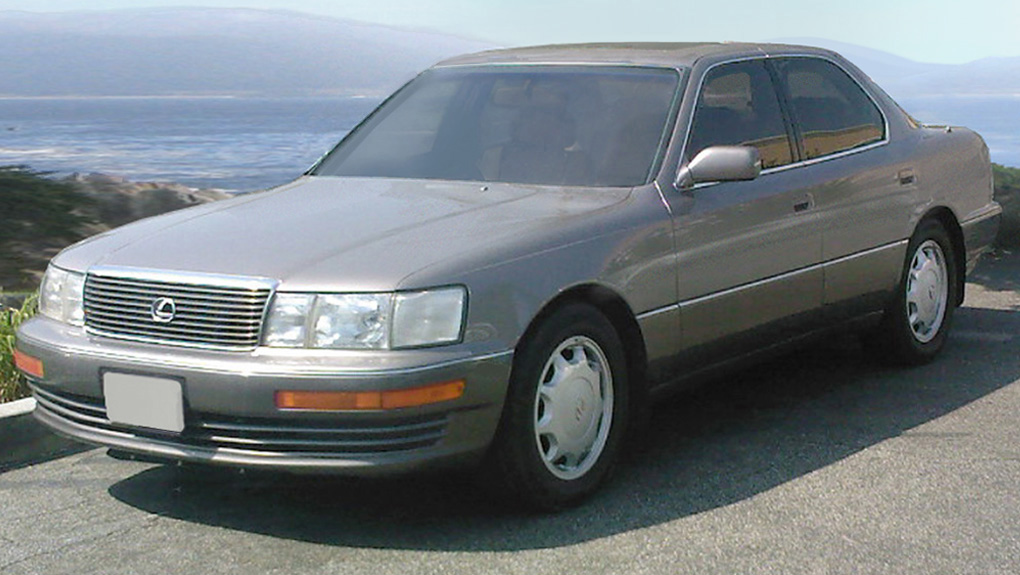
1992–1994 Lexus LS 400 (UCF10 II)

Debuting in September 1992 as a 1993 model, the refreshed LS 400 (designed through 1991) was introduced with more than 50 changes, largely in response to customer and dealer requests. The vehicle received larger disc brakes, wheels, and tires, and adjustments were made to the suspension and power steering systems to improve handling. Stylistic changes included additional body side moldings and a revised grille, along with a greater selection of colors.

For the interior, a standard passenger front airbag (making this vehicle the first Toyota-built series production car available with passenger front airbag), external temperature gauge, digital odometer, seat belt pretensioners, and chlorofluorocarbon-free refrigerant were added. In 1992, the Celsior introduced the world's first GPS navigation system with voice instructions, supplied by Aisin. By 1994, the LS 400's U.S. base price exceeded US$50,000, a figure that had steadily risen since the vehicle's introduction. Customer demand for the vehicle and shifts in foreign exchange rates contributed to the increase in price.

== Second generation (XF20; 1994) ==
Second generation
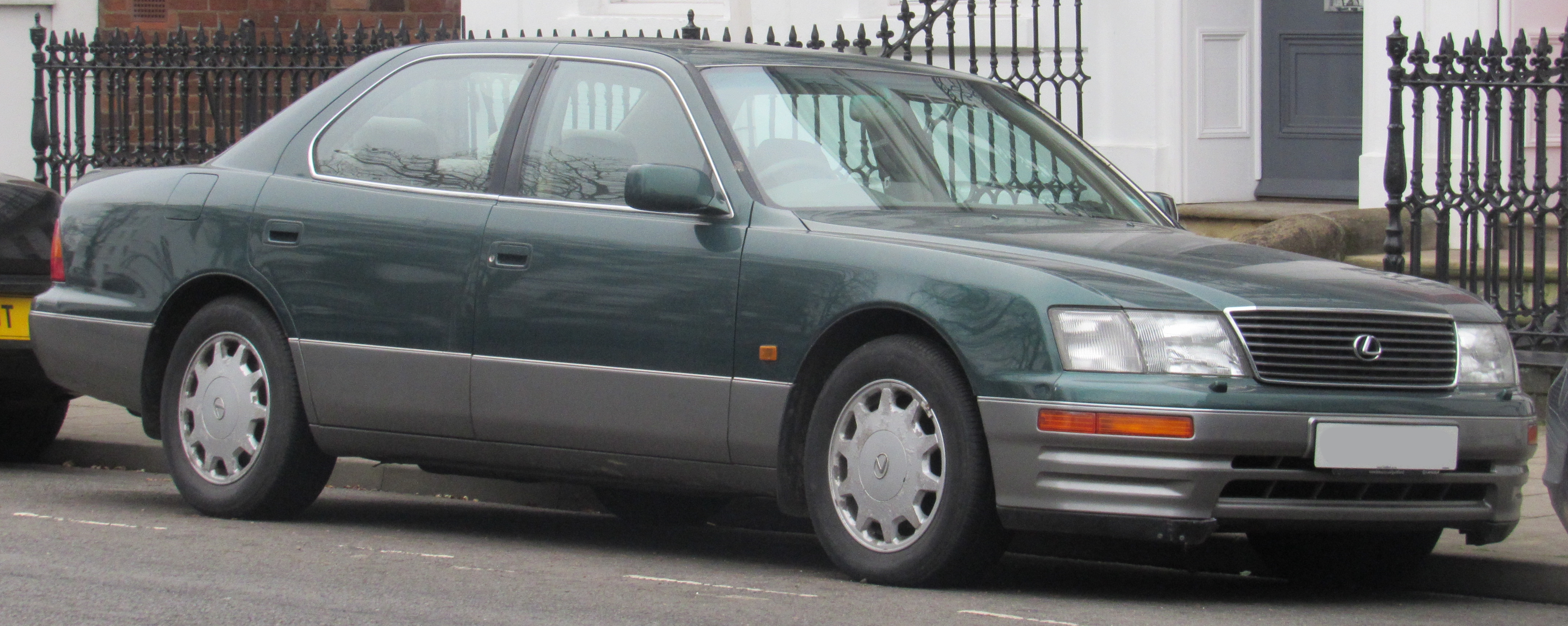
- 1996 Lexus LS 400 (UCF20; pre-facelift, UK)

Overview
- Model code: XF20
- Also called: Toyota Celsior (Japan)
- Production: October 1994 – June 2000
- Model years: 1995–2000
- Designer: 1991: Kunihiro Uchida (Chief Exterior); Makoto Oshima (Exterior); 1996 facelift: Hiroaki Shinoda

Body and chassis
- Layout: Front-engine, rear-wheel-drive

Powertrain
- Engine: 3,968 cc (242 cu in) 1UZ-FE V8
- Power output: 194 kW (260 hp) (1994–1997); 216 kW (290 hp) (1997–2000)
- Transmission: 4-speed A340E automatic; 5-speed A650E automatic

Dimensions
- Wheelbase: 2,850 mm (112.2 in)
- Length: 4,996 mm (196.7 in)
- Width: 1,829 mm (72.0 in)
- Height: 1,420–1,435 mm (55.9–56.5 in)
- Curb weight: 1,659–1,764 kg (3,657–3,889 lb)

=== 1994–1997 ===
The second-generation Lexus LS 400 (UCF20) debuted in November 1994 (for the 1995 model year) with a longer wheelbase and similar specifications as the original model. The public unveiling of the vehicle occurred in a gala ceremony held at the San Francisco Opera House in California. The sedan was equipped with an updated 4.0-litre 1UZ-FE V8 engine, producing 194 kilowatts (260 hp) and 366 newton-metres (270 ft⋅lbf) of torque. Internally, over 90% of the redesigned LS 400's composition was new or redesigned, with increased sound insulation, a strengthened body structure, suspension updates (first LS/Celsior with Skyhook adaptive computerized air suspension), and improved brakes. The redesigned model was 95 kg (209 lb) lighter than its predecessor and achieved slightly better fuel economy. The 0–100 kilometres per hour (62 mph) time improved to 7.5 seconds.

Development of the second-generation LS 400 began after worldwide launch of the first generation under program code 250T. Given the first-generation model's successful reception and high level of customer satisfaction with its design, replicating the original LS 400's attributes with its successor was one of chief engineer Kazuo Okamoto's primary goals (he stated that "a tradition cannot be founded if you reject the first generation"). Externally, the most significant change was an increase in wheelbase length of 36 mm (1.4 in), resulting in more interior space and an additional 66 mm (2.6 in) of rear-seat legroom. However, as the overall length remained the same, boot capacity was slightly reduced. The more aerodynamic body (C_{d} 0.28) retained the general profile and contours of the original LS 400 and was the work of the Calty Design Research center in the U.S. Designers had evaluated 20 competing concepts, including several with a radically changed body, before selecting a winning entry in 1991 that included forms and contours similar to the original LS 400. Upon final approval in 1992, an evolutionary redesign was the ultimate result, with new design features consisting of sharper angles, curved body lines, and a beveled grille. More prominent side lines provided a reference point for parking maneuvers, and forward visibility was improved. Production development lasted from 1991 until conclusion in the second quarter of 1994. Design patents were filed at the Japan Patent Office on October 14, 1992 under registration number 732548, using a prototype.

The redesigned LS 400 interior received upgraded features, varying from dual-zone climate controls to rear cupholders. A newly patented seat cushion design, similar to the car's suspension, used lightweight internal coil springs and stabilizer bars to improve comfort. One of the first in-dash CD changers was offered as an option. Safety enhancements included enlarged crumple zones, three-point seat belts at all positions, and a new collapsible steering column. In Japan, the Toyota Celsior equivalents were offered in the same "A", "B", and top-spec "C" configurations as before, along with an additional selection of exterior colours. Several optional features, such as a compact disc-based Global Positioning System (GPS) navigation system and reclining rear seats, were available only in Japan.

At its U.S. debut, the redesigned LS 400 retained a pricing advantage over European competitors in its largest market, launching with a base price of US$51,000. However, cost differences had narrowed following more aggressive pricing and added feature content from rival manufacturers. To promote their new flagship, Lexus launched a US$50 million advertising campaign, the most expensive marketing effort since the launch of the division. In mid-1995, sales slowed as the U.S. government threatened tariffs on Japanese luxury cars over the widening U.S.-Japan trade deficit, potentially raising the price of a fully optioned LS 400 to over US$100,000. Subsequent negotiations averted the sanctions by the second quarter of that year, and sales recovered in the following months. Ultimately, second-generation LS 400 sales were lower than the original model; production totaled approximately 114,000 units.

Production of the UCF20 ran from October 1994 to July 1997. For 1997, a limited "Coach Edition" LS 400 was produced in partnership with American leather manufacturer Coach Inc. The edition featured Coach leather seats; embroidered emblems on the exterior, floormats, and armrest; special colours and added trim; and a Coach cabin bag. Production was limited to a yearly run of 2,500 units.

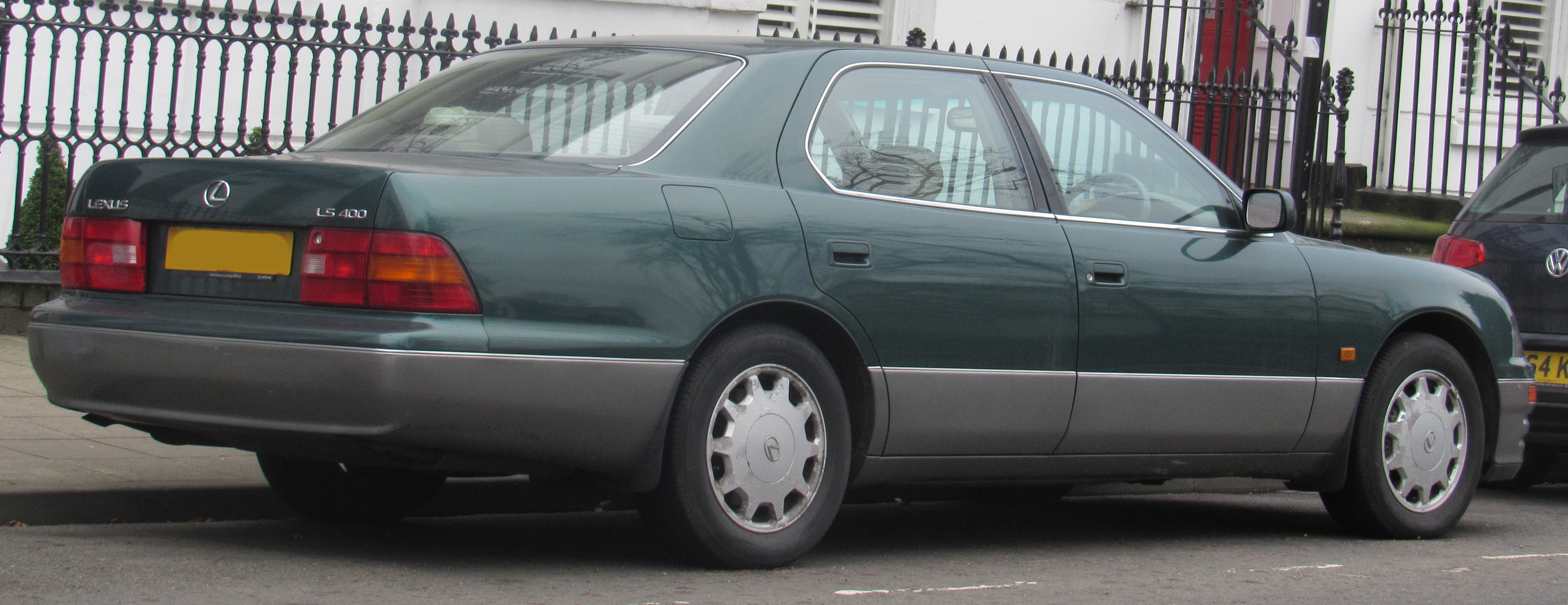
1996 Lexus LS 400 (UCF20; pre-facelift, UK)

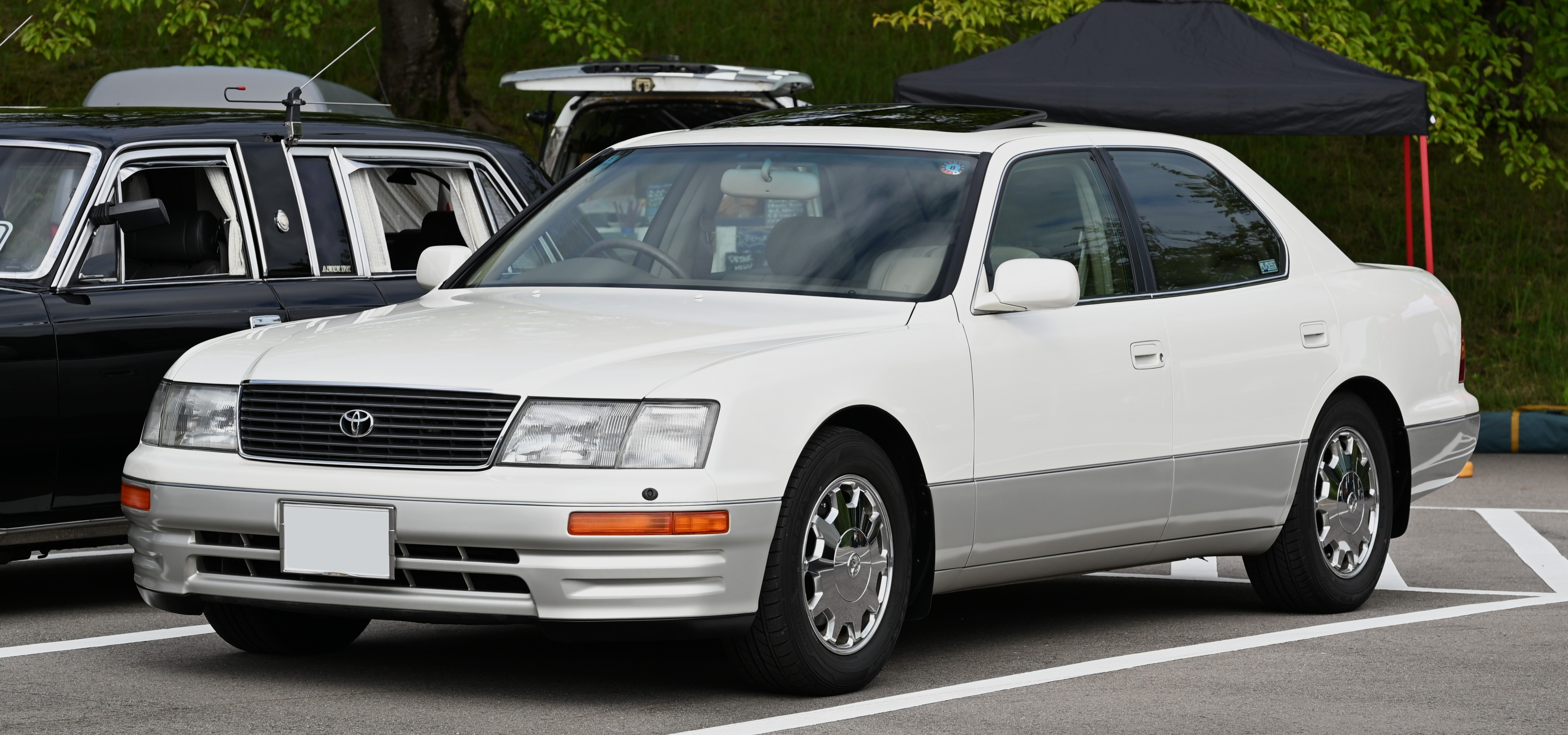
Toyota Celsior (Japan, pre-facelift)

=== 1997–2000 ===
Designed through early 1996, in September 1997 a revised LS 400 was introduced for the 1998 model year. Changes were a five-speed automatic transmission, increased engine output to 216 kW (290 hp), with variable valve timing (VVT-i), and an added 41 N⋅m (30 ft⋅lbf) of torque. Acceleration times and fuel economy were improved as a result. The suspension and steering also received minor tweaks to improve feel and handling. Stylistically, the vehicle sported a new front fascia, side mirrors, and updated wheels; a rear window diversity antenna replaced the conventional power mast. The cabin received upgrades, including a trip computer, HomeLink, retractable rear headrests, reading lamps, and ultraviolet-tinted glass.

In August 1997, the first production laser adaptive cruise control on a Toyota vehicle was introduced on the Celsior version (Japan only). It controlled speed only through throttle control and downshifting, but did not apply the brakes. A CD-ROM-based GPS automotive navigation system became an option in the U.S. Added safety features included front side airbags, vehicle stability control and in 2000, brake assist. Low beam HID headlamps were introduced as well. The headlights were also equipped with a programmable delay feature for proximity illumination. In February 2000, the limited "Platinum Series" LS 400 was introduced at the Chicago Auto Show in partnership with American Express. The edition featured most luxury options as standard, along with separate exterior colours, wheels, badging, and two years' no-fee use of an American Express Platinum Card.

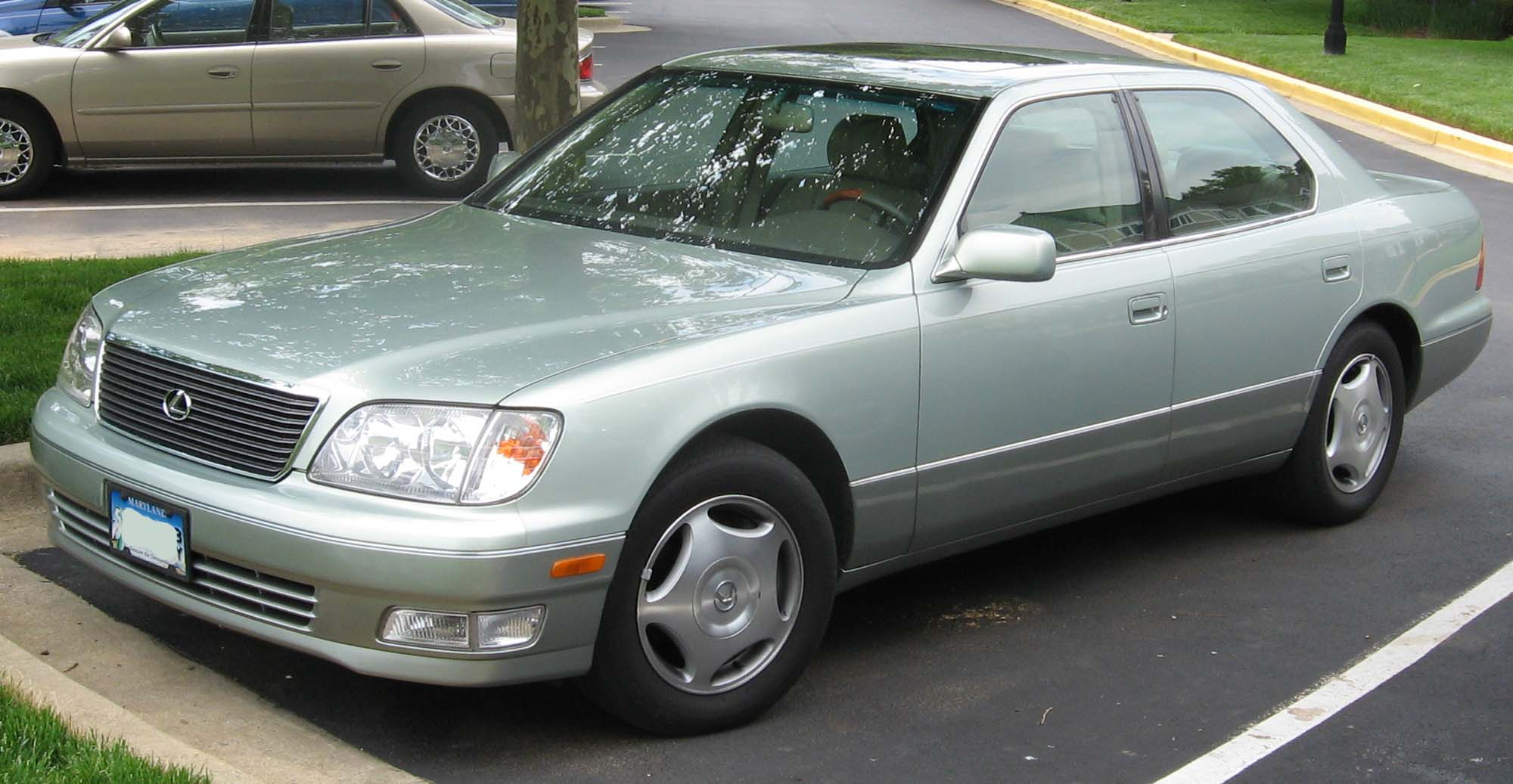
1998–2000 Lexus LS 400

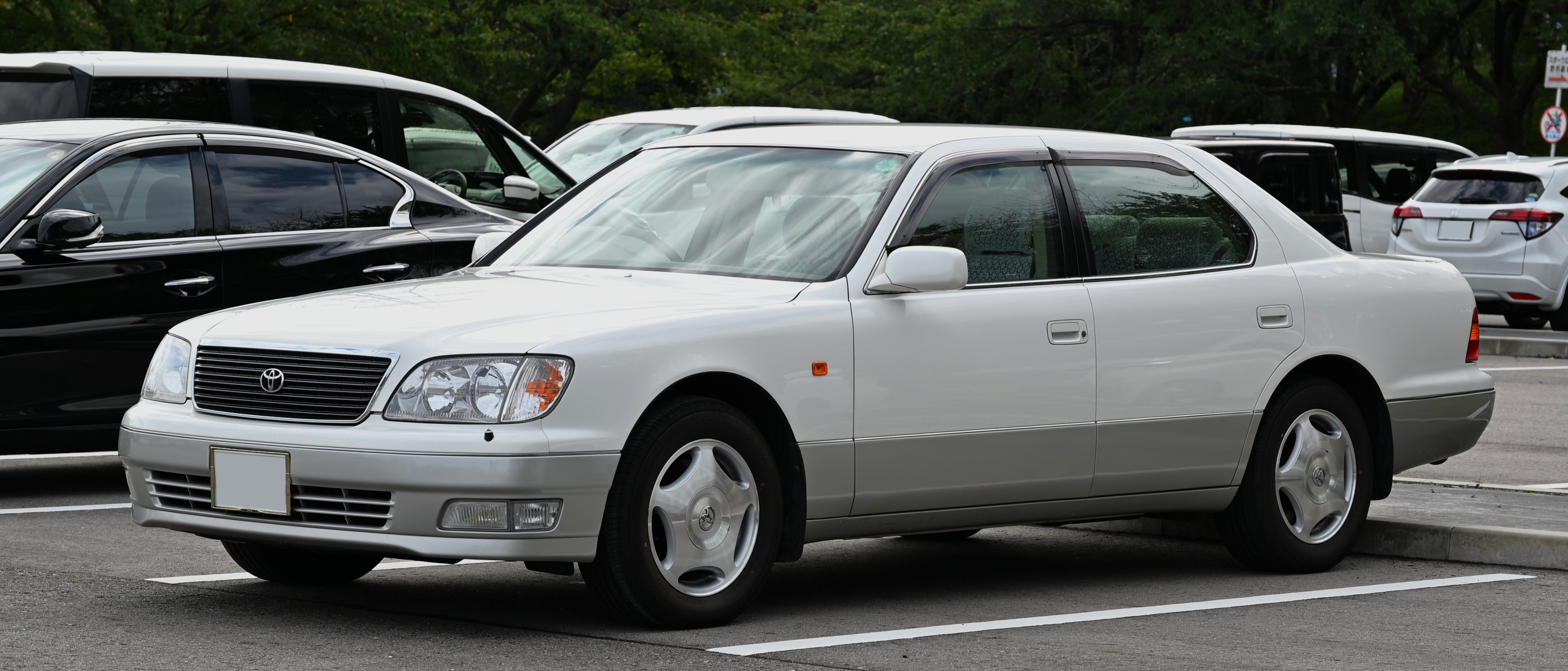
1997-2000 Toyota Celsior (Japan)

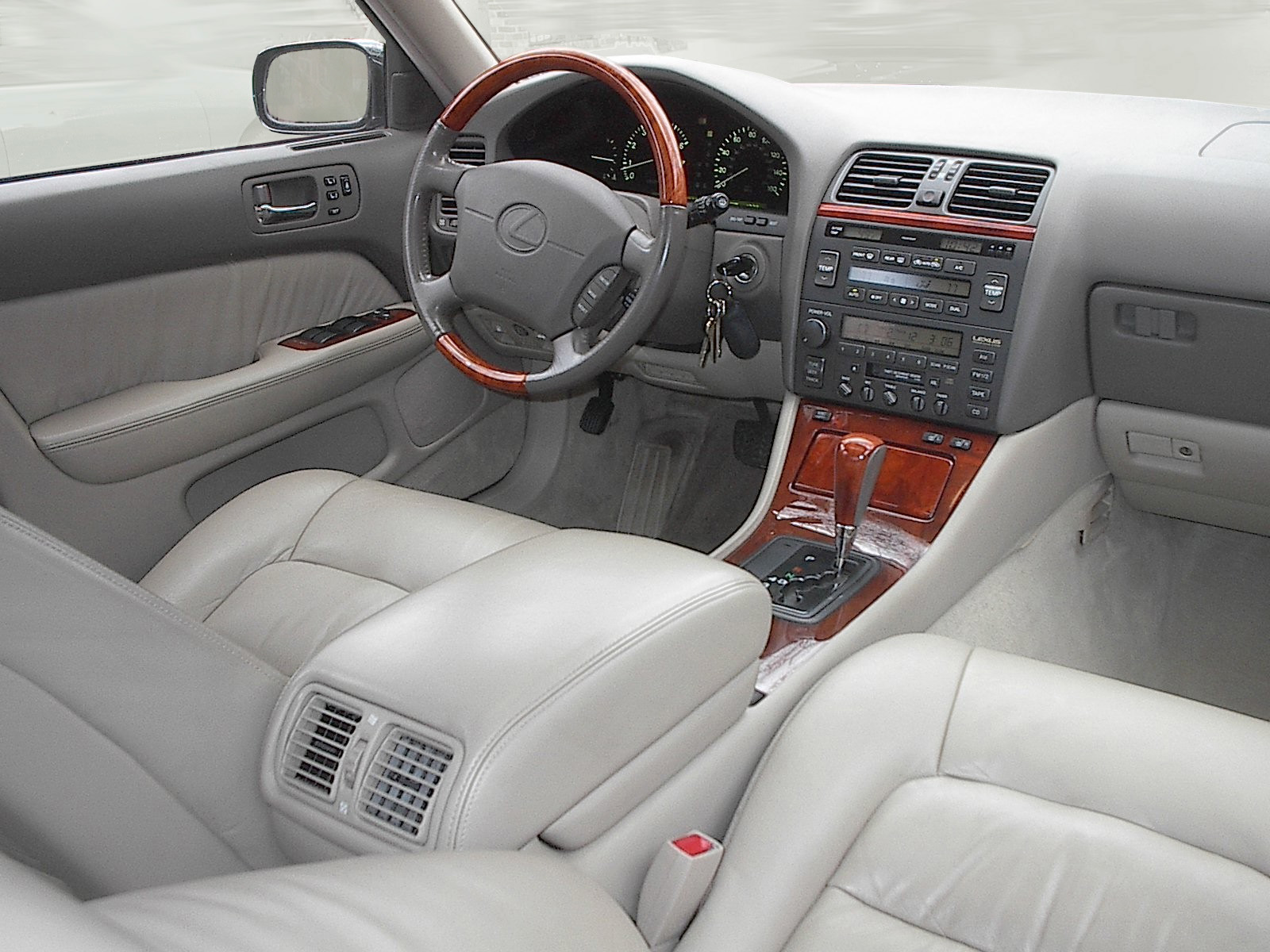
Second-generation LS 400 cabin (UCF20, facelift)

== Third generation (XF30; 2000) ==
Third generation
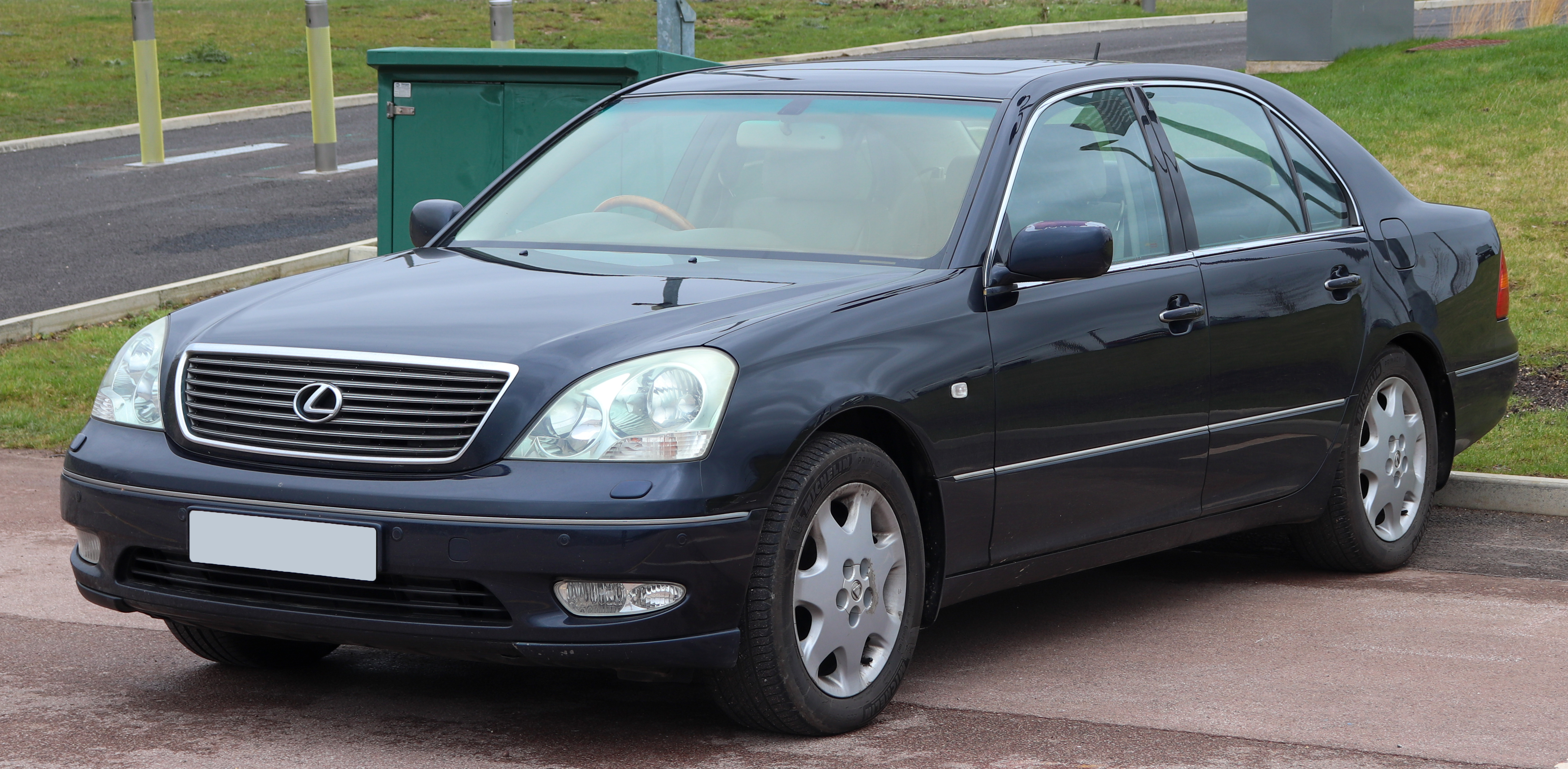
- 2003 Lexus LS 430 (UCF30; pre-facelift, UK)

Overview
- Model code: XF30
- Also called: Toyota Celsior (Japan)
- Production: July 2000 – August 2006
- Model years: 2001–2006
- Designer: 1997: Akihiro Nagaya; Makoto Oshima (chief designer); 2002 facelift: Machio Nakamura

Body and chassis
- Layout: Front-engine, rear-wheel-drive

Powertrain
- Engine: 4,292 cc (262 cu in) 3UZ-FE V8
- Power output: 216 kW (290 hp)
- Transmission: 5-speed A650E automatic; 6-speed A761E automatic

Dimensions
- Wheelbase: 2,926 mm (115.2 in)
- Length: 5,010–5,014 mm (197.2–197.4 in)
- Width: 1,829 mm (72.0 in)
- Height: 1,491 mm (58.7 in)
- Curb weight: 1,810–1,812 kg (3,990–3,995 lb)

=== 2000–2003 ===
The third-generation Lexus LS 430 (UCF30) debuted at the North American International Auto Show in January 2000 as a 2001 model, introducing a new body design with a host of new interior and technological features. It was the first US market Lexus with adaptive cruise control (called Dynamic Laser Cruise Control). It employed a lidar sensor and (unlike the laser ACC introduced in 1997 on the Celsior) was able to activate brakes for deceleration. The sedan was equipped with a new 4.3-litre 3UZ-FE engine generating 216 kW (290 hp) and 407 N⋅m (300 lb⋅ft) of torque. The LS 430 was one of the first gasoline V8 vehicles to be certified as an Ultra Low Emissions Vehicle (ULEV). The standard suspension had been completely redesigned, with a double-wishbone setup at all four wheels; a tuned suspension was offered for the first time. A new torque-activated electronic control unit made throttle adjustments based on vehicle speed, engine revolutions per minute, and pedal position. The LS 430 sported a 0–100 km/h (62 mph) acceleration time of 6.7 seconds. Sales began in October 2000 in the United States.

Heading into the planning of the LS 430, division executives concluded that the previous LS redesign had been too restrained in its approach. The LS 430 development team, led by chief engineer Yasushi Tanaka, accordingly opted for a more thorough exterior, interior, and technological redevelopment. The development of the LS 430 took four years. Selected from 16 different concept designs, the resulting vehicle of December 1997—when the final design (by Akihiro Nagaya) was approved—saw the sedan's dimensions increase in terms of wheelbase and height. The exterior featured a larger grille with rounded edges, quarter windows on the rear doors, and rounded trapezoidal headlamps. The body was also more aerodynamic than previous LS sedans (C_{d} 0.26; 0.25 with air suspension), and was the product of wind tunnel testing at facilities used for Shinkansen bullet train development. A 76-millimetre (3.0 in) wheelbase stretch resulted in more interior volume and allowed the engine to be positioned further aft for better balance. Boot space was increased by one-third due to repositioning of the fuel tank.

Compared to previous generations, the LS 430 featured a greater number of model configurations and options. While sharing the same body style, variants were differentiated by chassis configuration and onboard equipment. Models with the tuned sport suspension, sold as the "Touring" package in the United States, featured larger, high-speed brakes. These brakes were also standard on European market models. Fully optioned models with height adjustable air suspension, tuned for a combination of soft ride and responsive handling, were sold in the United States as the "Ultra Luxury" edition.

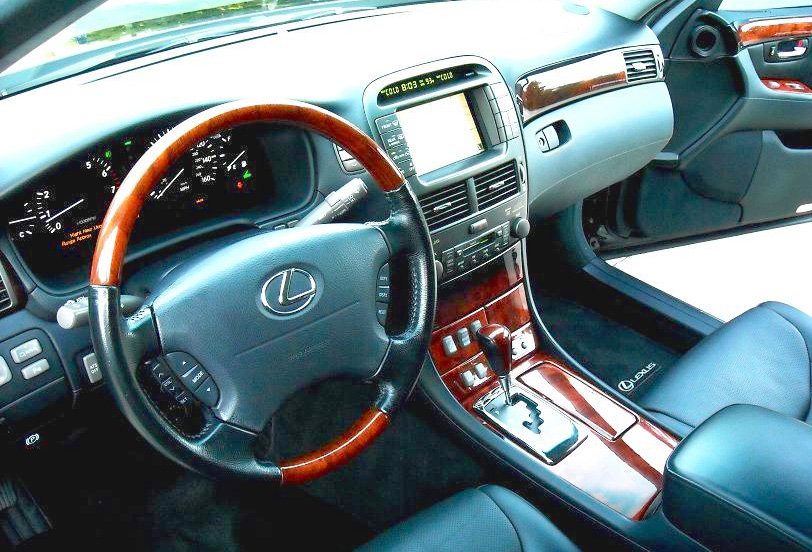
Third-generation LS 430 cabin (UCF30)

The LS 430 interior featured walnut wood trim on the dashboard and upper doors, along with semi-aniline leather and oscillating air conditioning vents. A liquid crystal display with touchscreen on the upper center console served as interface. The system was the first LS with voice controlled navigation and the first luxury sedan to transition to DVD-based maps. Lexus also introduced a Mark Levinson premium sound system. In its highest trim specification, the LS 430 included Lexus Link telematics, power door and boot closers, heated and cooled front seats, and power reclining massage rear seats equipped with audio controls, power sunshade, a cooler, and air purifier. Several rear seat features adopted for the LS 430 had been previously available in Japanese market luxury vehicles. Safety features added to the LS 430 included front and rear side curtain airbags, park sensors, rain-sensing windshield wipers, and electronic brakeforce distribution. The vehicle also gained water repellent windshield and side glass.

At the high end, the LS 430's pricing encroached on European rivals as Lexus became increasingly able to command higher price premiums for its vehicles. Sales for the LS 430 surpassed the previous generation, and production exceeded 140,000 units. The LS 430 was produced until July 2006, marking the last occasion the Lexus flagship was produced in a single body style. In Japan, the equivalent Toyota Celsior was also sold from August 2000 until March 2006, when the long-awaited introduction of Lexus Japan saw the arrival of new generation Lexus models.

In every year of production, the LS 430 was the most reliable luxury sedan in the J.D. Power and Associates Initial Quality Survey (with the early and late models of this series the best performing), and the highest recorded scorer in the history of J.D. Power's Vehicle Dependability Survey. Thatcham ratings data via the UK Motor Insurance Repair Research Centre listed the theft-prevention capabilities of the LS 430 as a maximum 5 stars, with the LS 430 being the first automobile to achieve the maximum theft-deterrence rating in 2001.

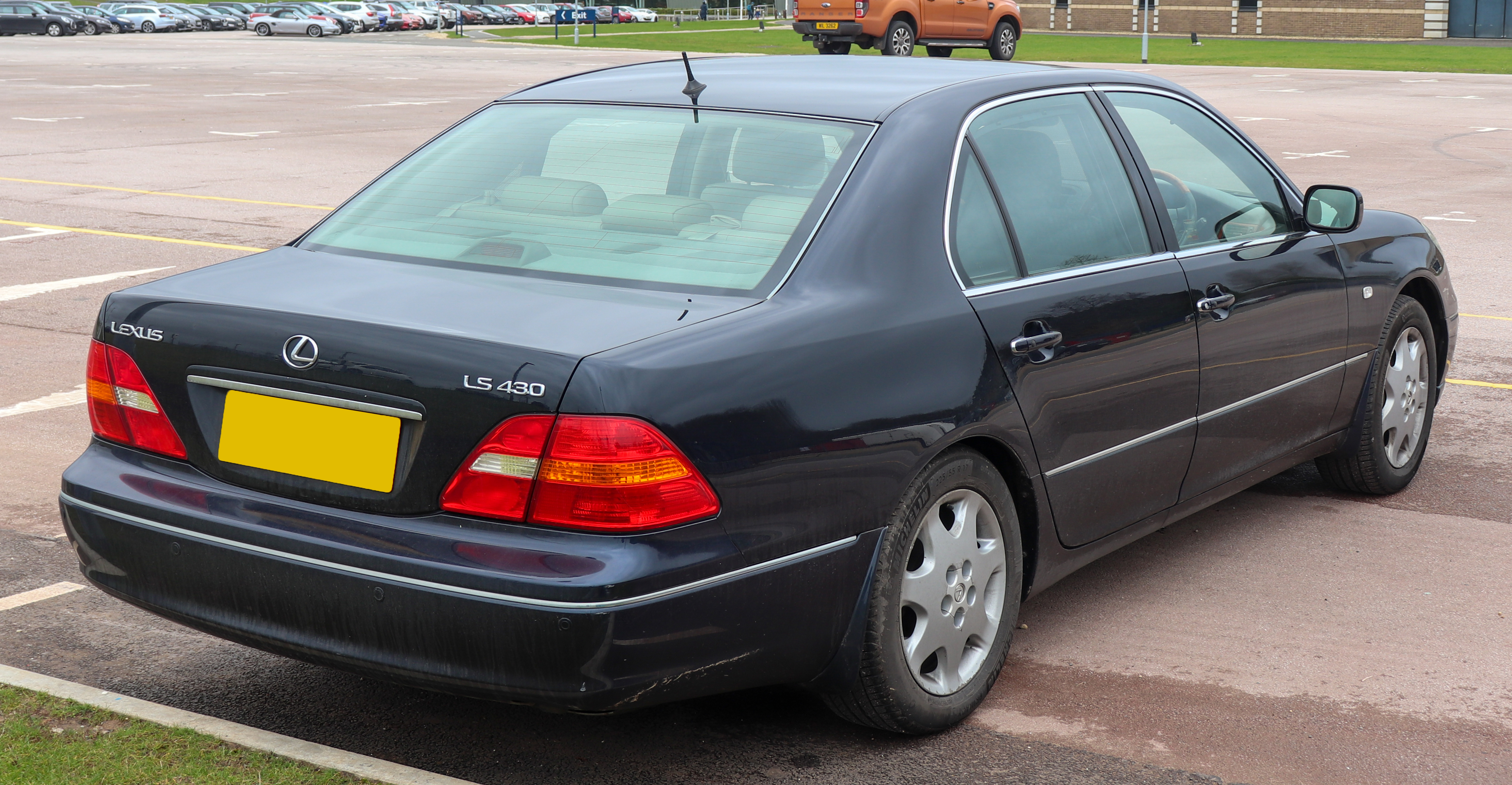
2003 Lexus LS 430 (UCF30; pre-facelift, UK)

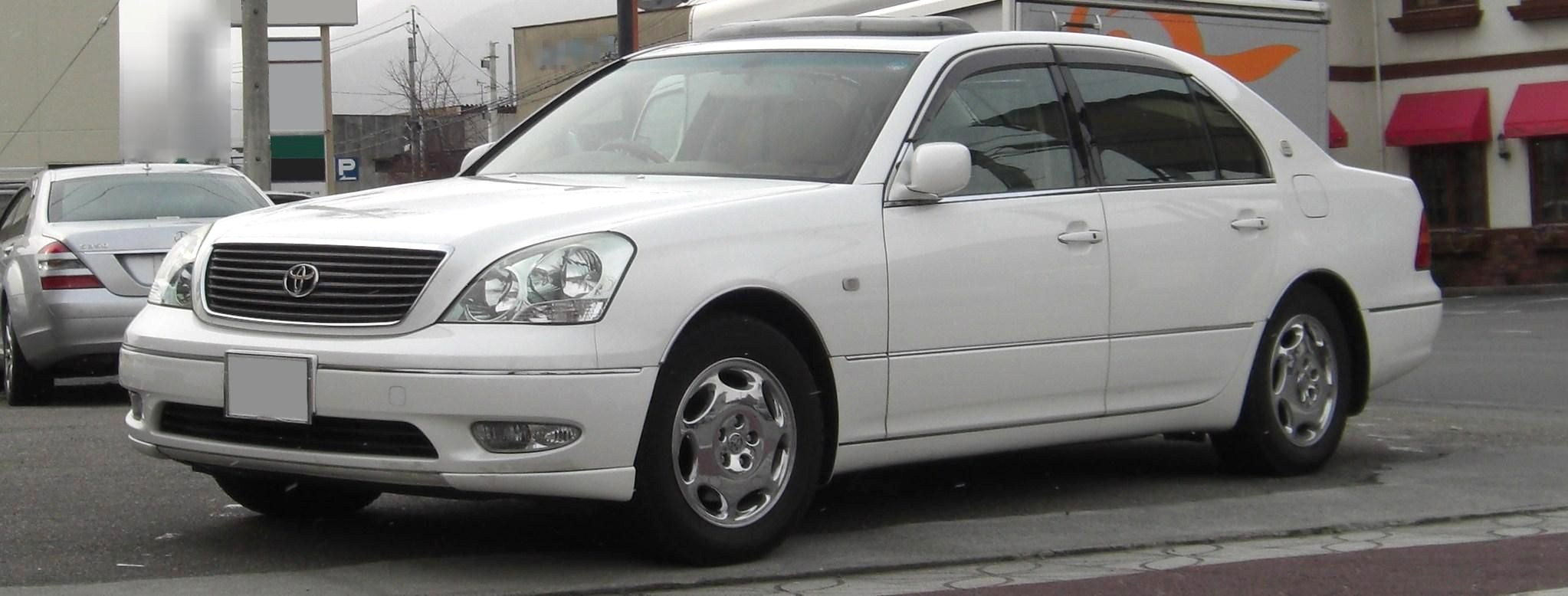
Pre-facelift Toyota Celsior

=== 2003–2006 ===
The facelifted LS 430 was revealed at the Frankfurt Motor Show in 2003. The first radar (instead of previous lidar) sensor on a Lexus sedan allowed the new Dynamic RADAR Cruise Control to work in any weather conditions. The millimetre-wave radar technology also enabled the first Pre-Collision System (PCS) on a Lexus sedan (with partial autonomous braking only on the Japanese market Toyota Celsior version). A "low-speed tracking mode" was added in 2004. The low-speed tracking mode was a second mode that would warn the driver if the car ahead stopped and provide braking; it could stop the car but then deactivated.

The facelifted LS introduced a new six-speed automatic transmission and revised styling. The powerplant remained the same as before. Exterior changes included restyled front and rear fascias, light-emitting diode (LED) taillights, and different wheels. It debuted the first Lexus high-intensity discharge headlights for the high beam (Bi-Xenon), and also the first AFS adaptive curve headlights, which swiveled the projector headlamps in the direction of vehicle turns.

The interior received knee airbags, lighted rear-seat vanity mirrors, and new trim selections, including bird's eye maple wood. New options included an updated navigation system, Bluetooth and a backup camera. A driver-programmable electronic key feature allowed the vehicle to detect the key fob in the owner's pocket and unlock the doors by touch.

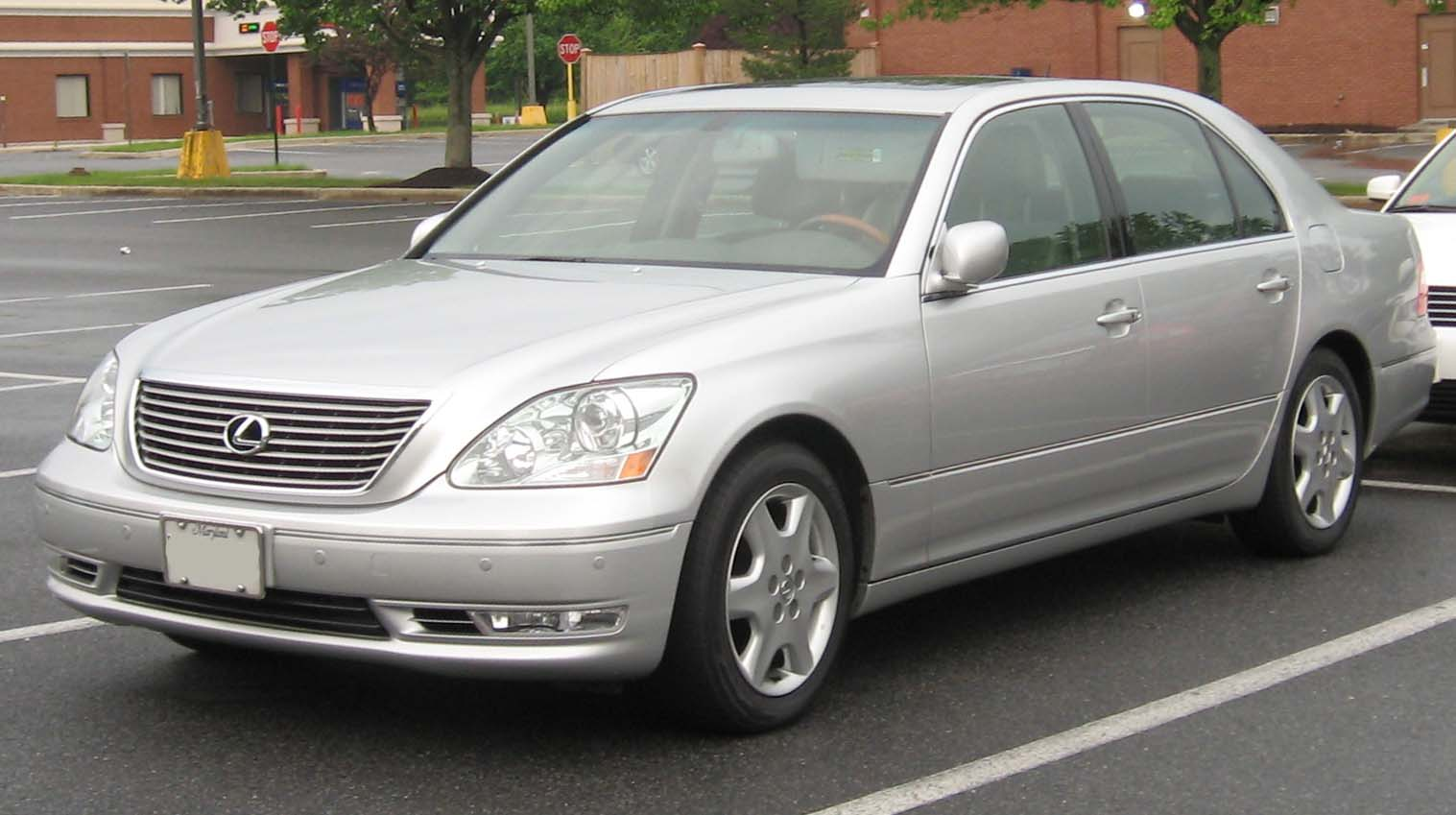
Lexus LS 430 (UCF30; facelift, US)

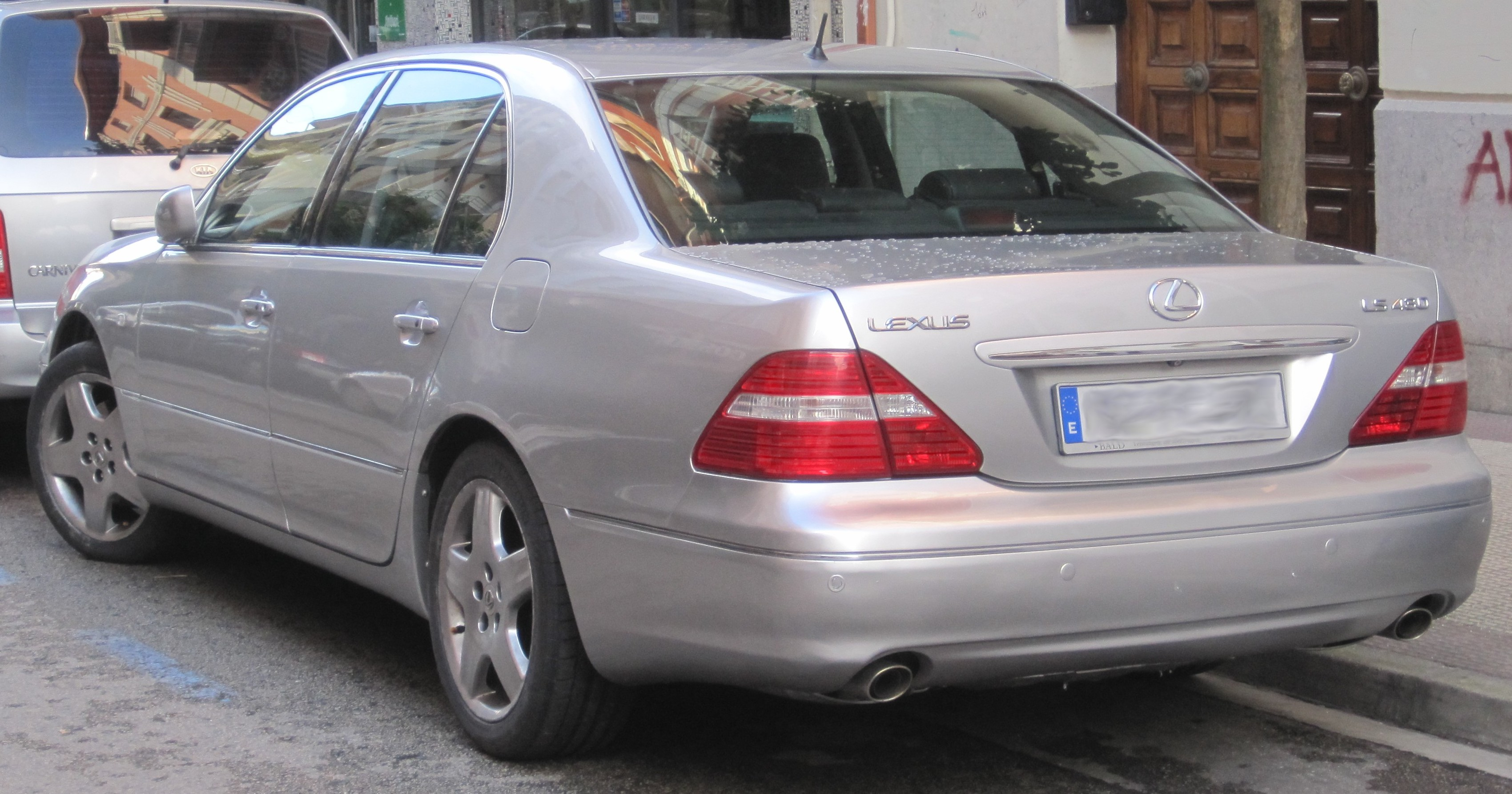
Lexus LS 430 (UCF30; facelift, Spain)

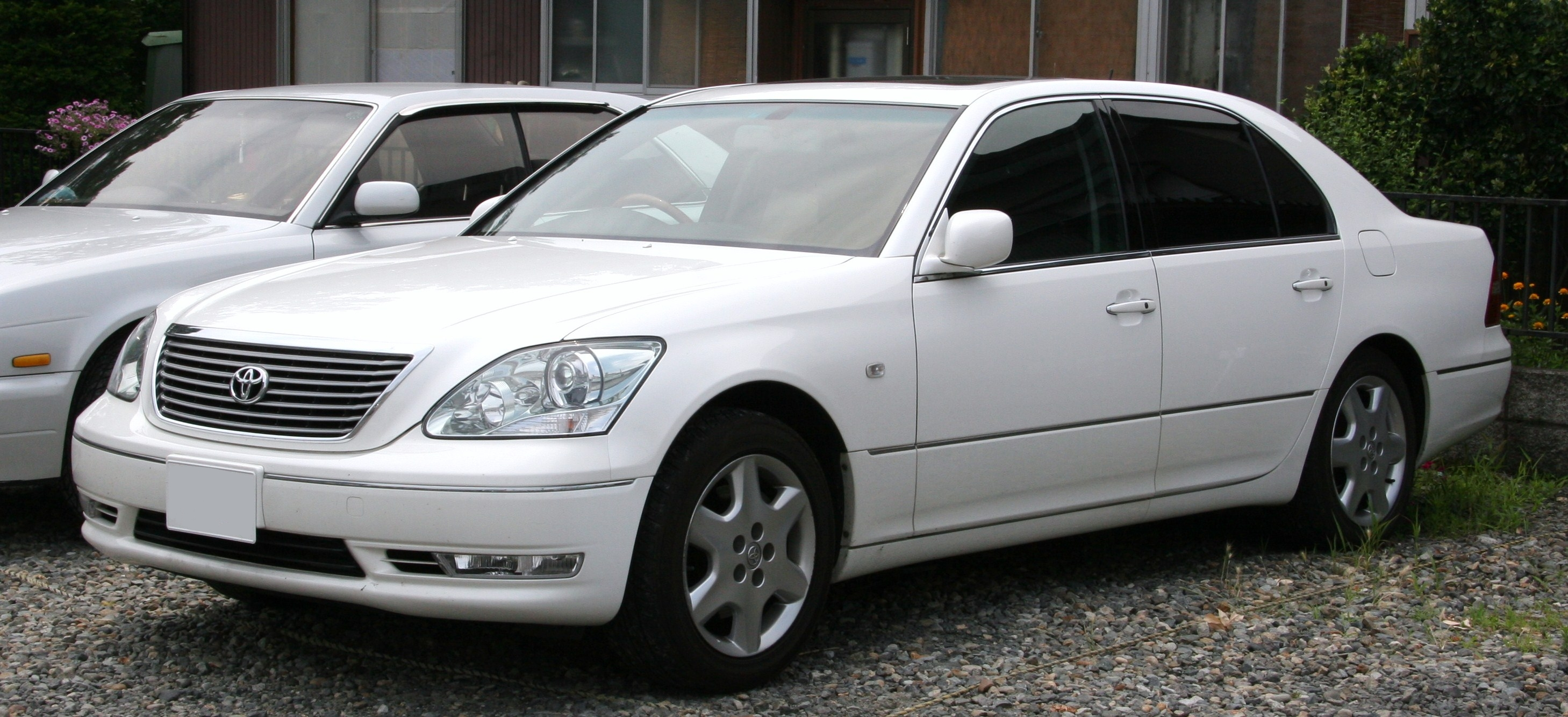
Facelift Toyota Celsior

== Fourth generation (XF40; 2006) ==
Fourth generation
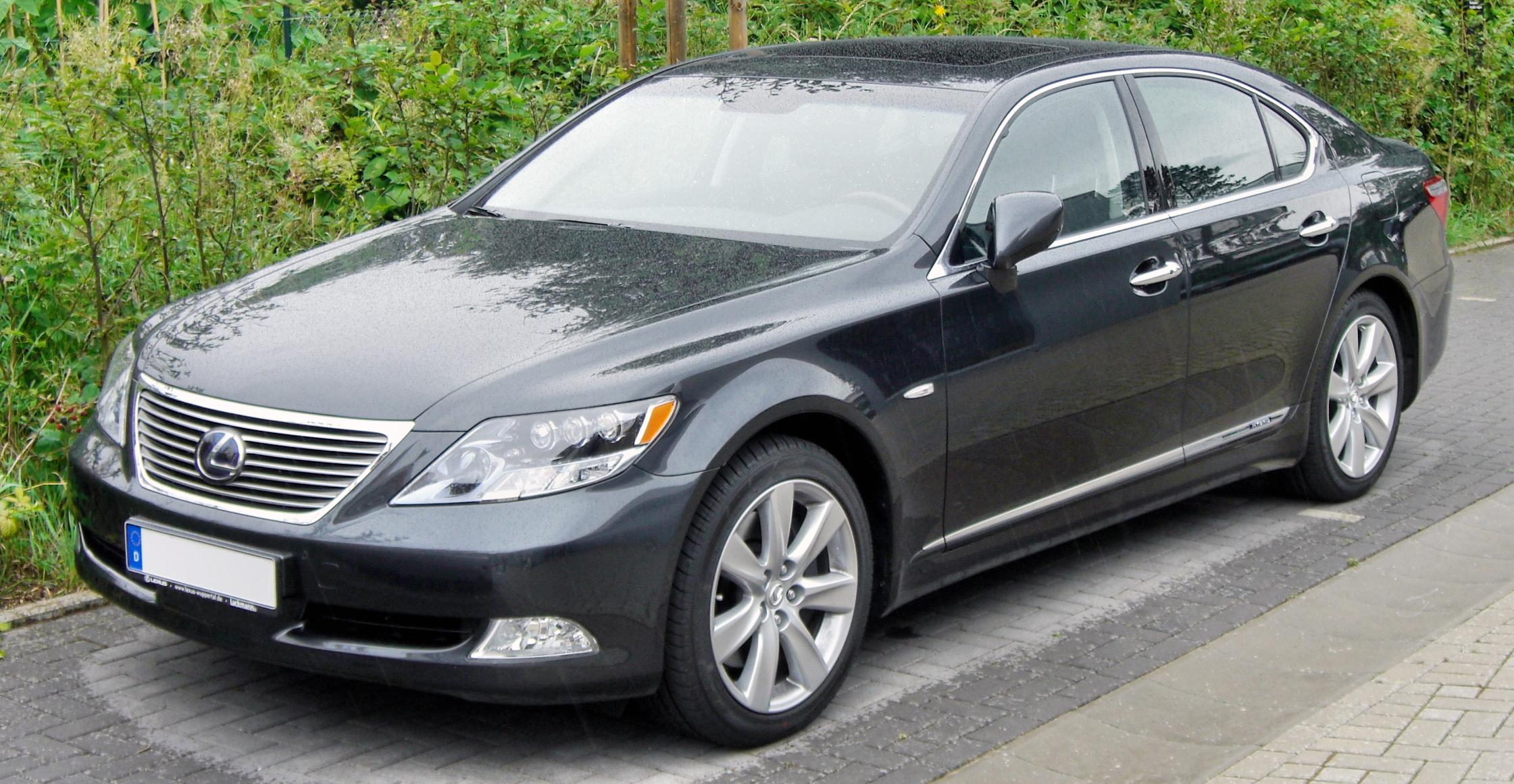

Overview
- Model code: XF40
- Production: September 2006 – October 2017
- Model years: 2007–2017
- Designer: 2003, hybrid 2004: Yo Hiruta

Body and chassis
- Layout: Front-engine, rear-wheel-drive; Front-engine, all-wheel-drive
- Platform: Toyota N platform
- Related: Toyota Century (G60) (for LS 600h L)

Powertrain
- Engine: 4,608 cc (281 cu in) 1UR-FE V8; 4,608 cc (281 cu in) 1UR-FSE V8; 4,969 cc (303 cu in) 2UR-FSE V8 hybrid (LS 600h)
- Power output: 283 kW (380 hp) (RWD); 268 kW (360 hp) (AWD); 327 kW (438 hp) (LS 600h)
- Transmission: 8-speed AA80E RWD automatic; 8-speed AA80F AWD automatic; Power-split Hybrid L110f (LS 600h)

Dimensions
- Wheelbase: 2,969 mm (116.9 in) (2007–2012; SWB); 3,090 mm (121.7 in) (2007–2012; LWB); 3,020 mm (118.9 in) (2012–2017; SWB); 3,120 mm (122.8 in) (2012–2017; LWB)
- Length: 5,029 mm (198.0 in) (2007–2012; SWB); 5,151 mm (202.8 in) (2007–2012; LWB); 5,060 mm (199.2 in) (2012–2017; SWB); 5,179 mm (203.9 in) (2012–2017; LWB)
- Width: 1,875 mm (73.8 in)
- Height: 1,466–1,481 mm (57.7–58.3 in)
- Curb weight: 1,925–1,965 kg (4,244–4,332 lb)

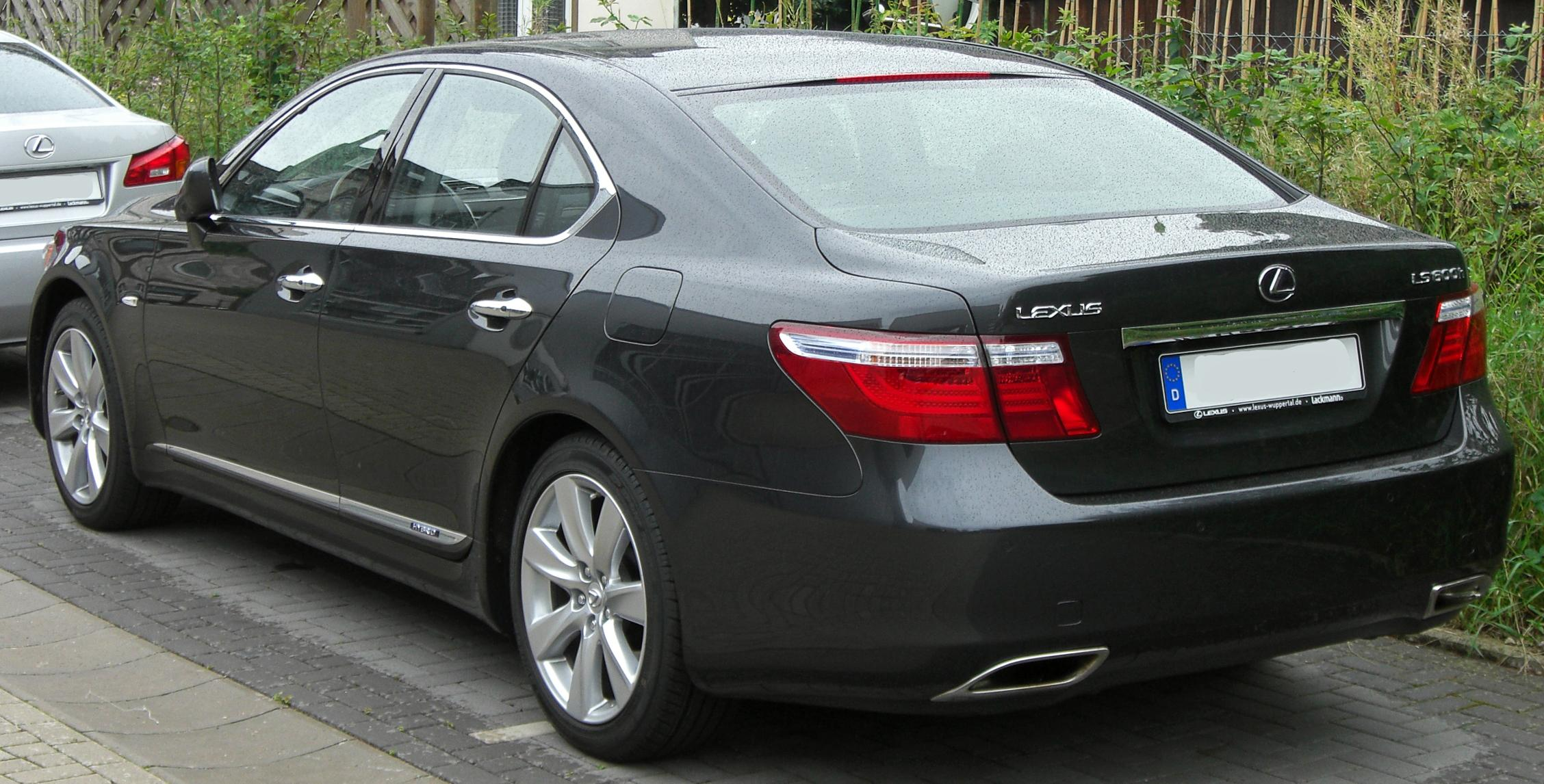
LS 600h (SWB; pre-facelift)

Introduced at the January 2006 North American International Auto Show for the 2007 model year, the fourth-generation Lexus LS became the first Lexus model to be produced in both standard and long-wheelbase versions. Using an all-new platform, the LS 460 (USF40) uses the standard 2,970 mm (117 in) wheelbase, while the LS 460 L (USF41) features a stretched 3,090 mm (122 in) wheelbase. A hybrid version, LS 600h L (UVF46), was previewed at the New York International Auto Show in April 2006. At its introduction in 2006, it won the Car of the Year Japan award for the second time.

The new LS came equipped with a new 4.6-litre 1UR-FSE V8 producing 283 kW (380 hp) and 498 N⋅m (367 ft⋅lbf) of torque, coupled to the first production eight-speed automatic transmission. The development of the LS 460 and its variants, led by chief engineer Moritaka Yoshida, began as Lexus was shifting its design strategy towards a more diversified product lineup, with new-vehicle launches largely focused on global markets. Externally, the Lexus LS received the styling cues of Lexus' new design direction, called L-finesse. First shown on the LF-Sh concept, the vehicle gained body forms running the length of the car, wheel arches, arrow-shaped chrome trim, a lower-set grille, and crystalline adaptive headlamps.

After debuting a hybrid powertrain with the 2005 LF-Sh concept, Lexus began sales of the LS 600h L (UVF46), the first production V8-powered full-hybrid vehicle, in May 2007 for the 2008 model year. All-wheel drive versions of the non-hybrid LS 460 (USF45) and LS 460 L (USF46) models premiered at the Moscow International Automobile Salon. Debuting in late 2009 for the 2010 model year, the revised LS 460 and LS 460 L included restyled front and rear fascias, side mirror turn signals, and new wheel designs. A more substantial facelift was first shown in July 2012, incorporating the new Lexus corporate fascia, comprising the "spindle" grille and consequently sees the fitment of a redesigned bonnet, reshaped front wings and headlamps, and a new bumper. The tail-lamps, boot lid, and rear bumper were also updated.

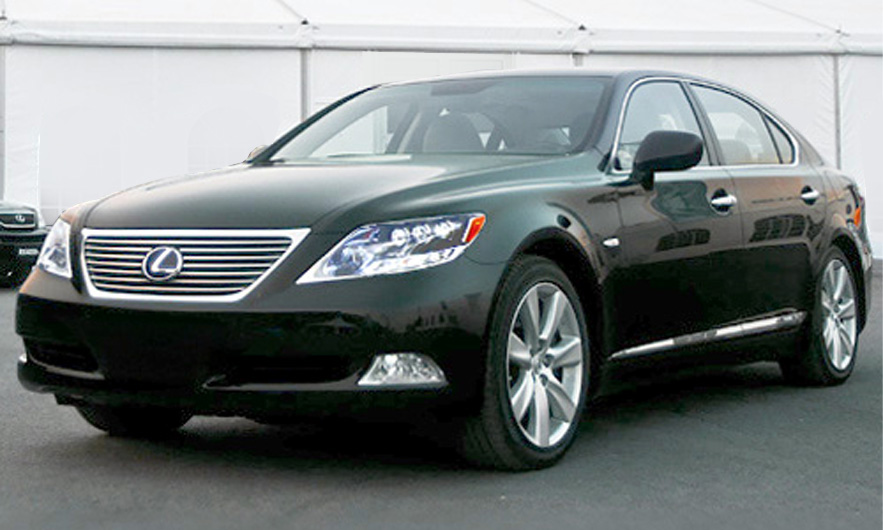
2007–2009 Lexus LS 600h L hybrid (UVF46)

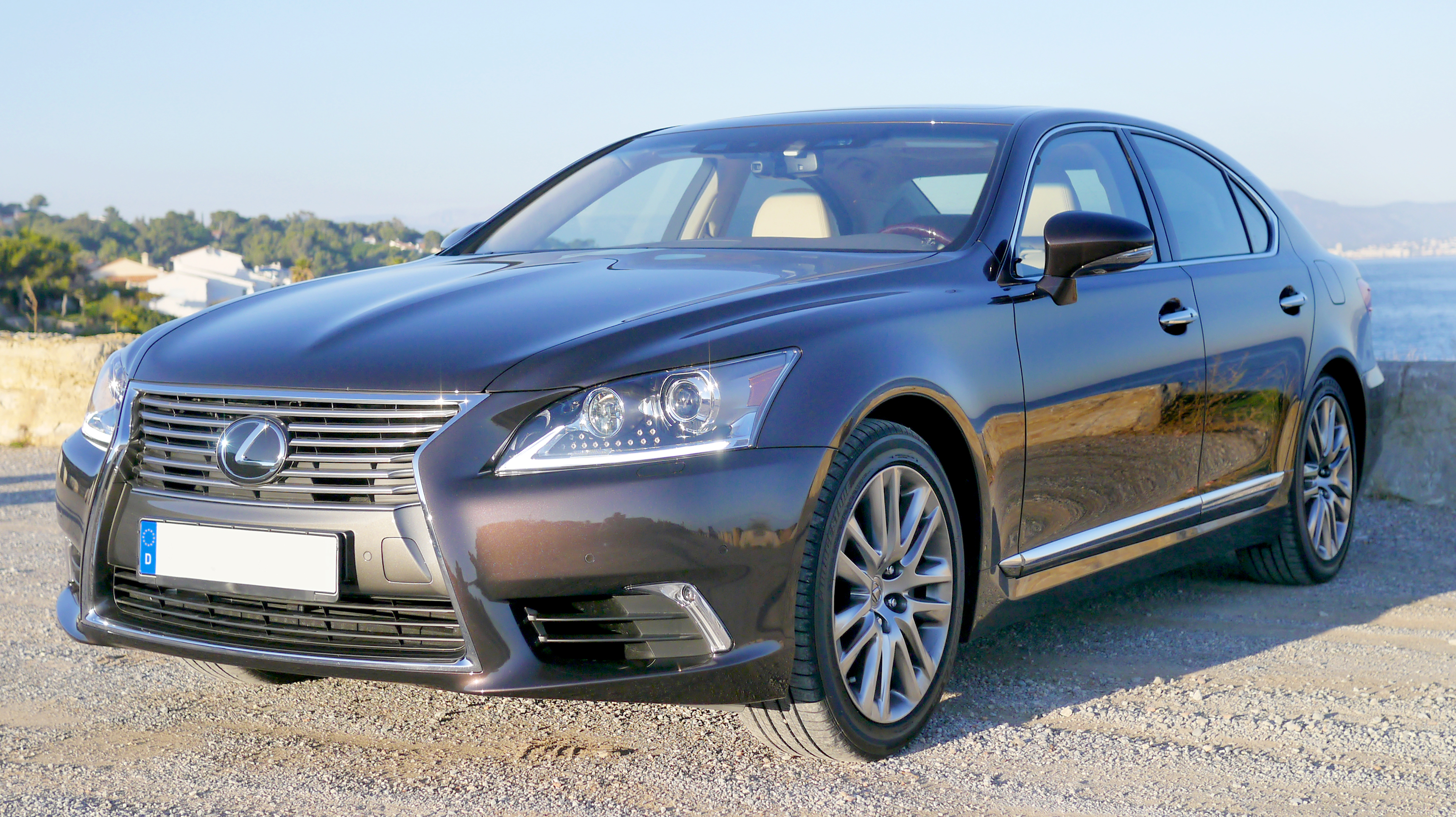
2012–2017 Lexus LS 460 (second facelift)

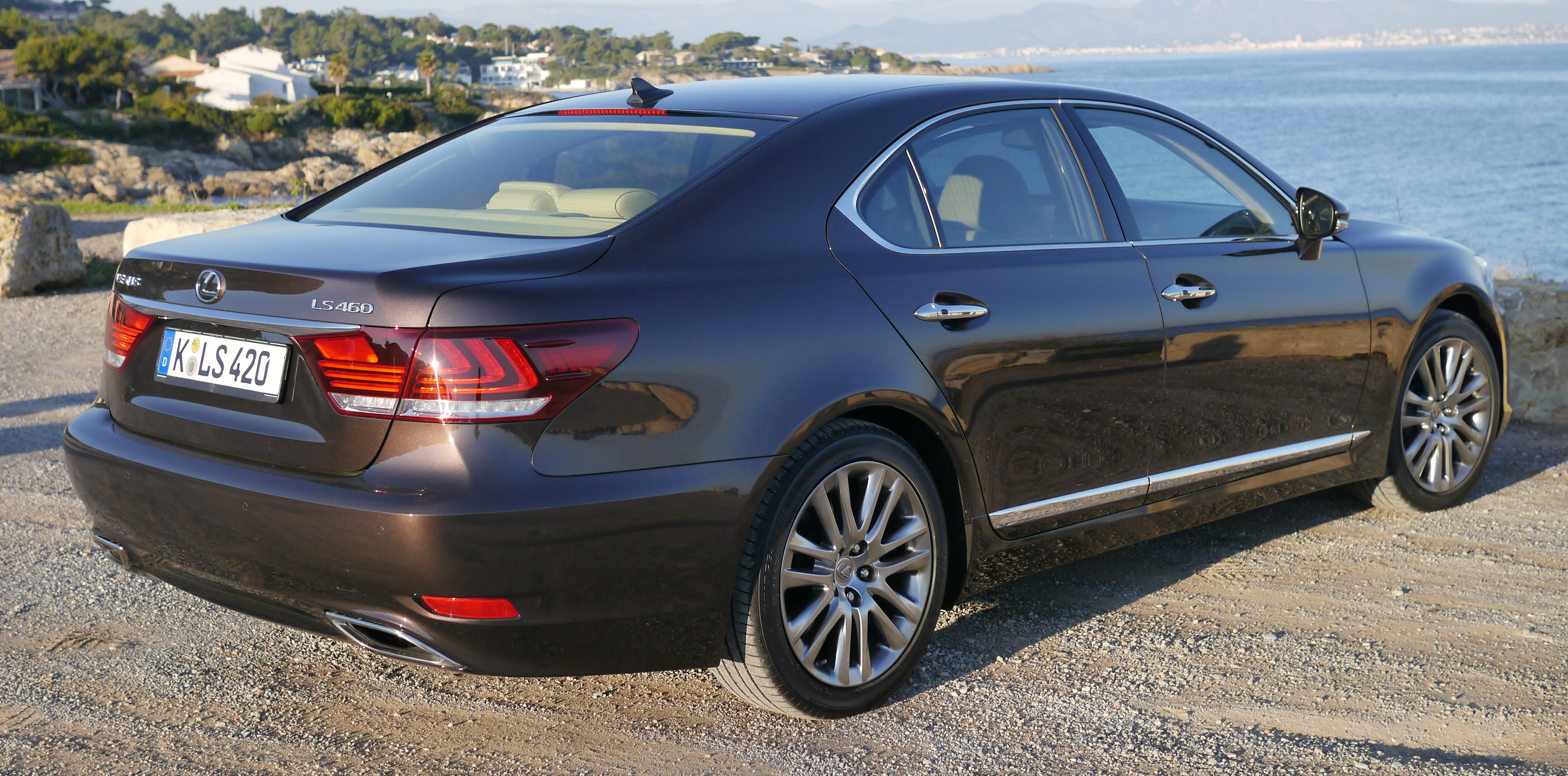
2012–2017 Lexus LS 460 (second facelift)

== Fifth generation (XF50; 2017) ==
Fifth generation
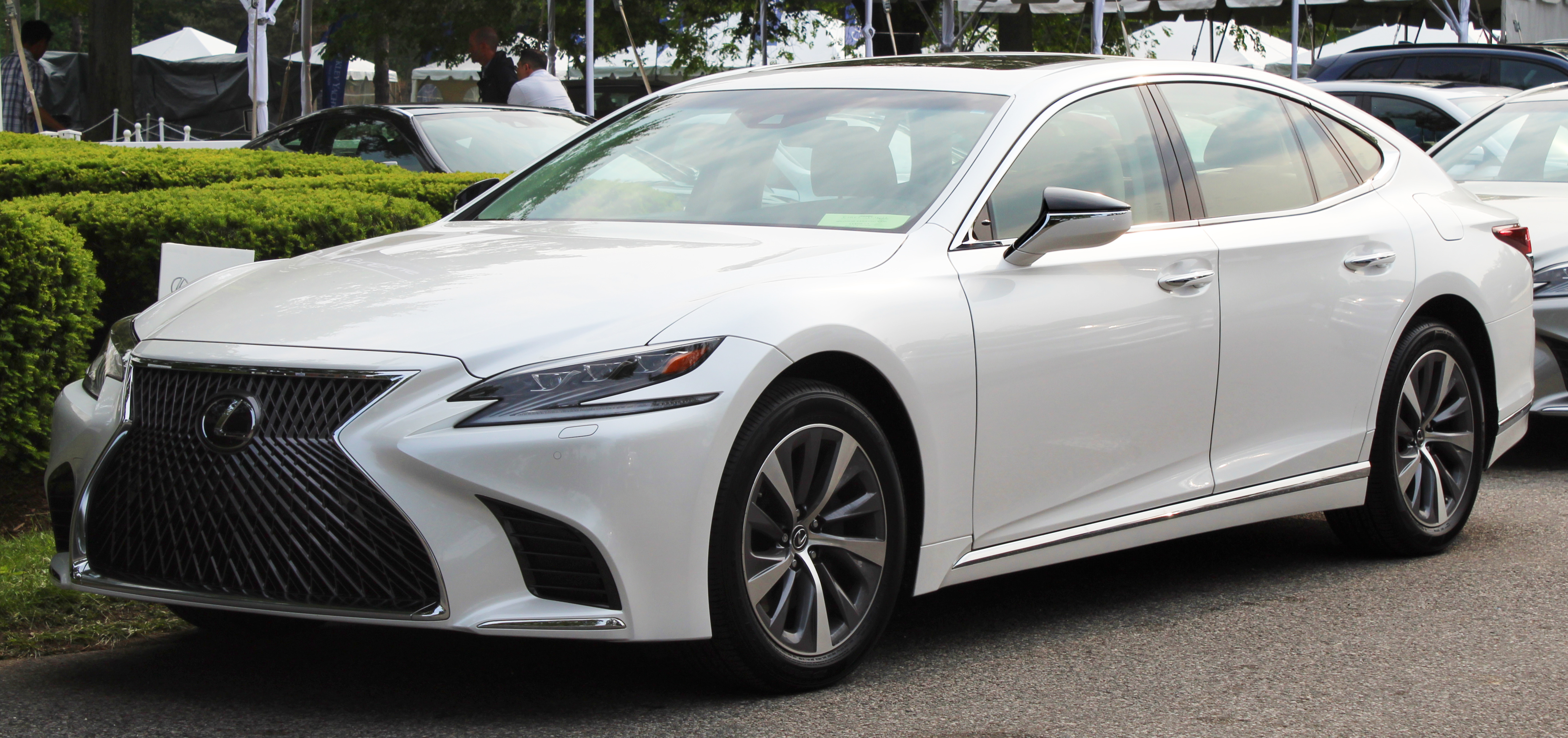
- LS 500 (GVF50, pre-facelift)

Overview
- Model code: XF50
- Production: December 2017 – present
- Model years: 2018–present
- Designer: 2013: Yoshio Kanesugi (exterior); Yamamoto Rei (interior); Koichi Suga (chief designer)

Body and chassis
- Layout: Front-engine, rear-wheel-drive; Front-engine, all-wheel-drive
- Platform: TNGA: GA-L
- Related: Lexus LC

Powertrain
- Engine: Petrol: 3,444 cc (210 cu in) V35A-FTS twin-turbo V6 (LS 500); 3,456 cc (211 cu in) 2GR-FKS/8GR-FKS V6 (LS 350); Hybrid: 3,456 cc (211 cu in) 8GR-FXS V6 (LS 500h)
- Electric motor: 2x 132 kW (177 hp; 179 PS) 2NM AC Permanent Magnet synchronous motors
- Power output: 309 kW (415 hp) (LS 500, V35A-FTS); 234 kW (318 PS) (LS 350, 2GR-FKS); 232 kW (315 PS) (LS 350, 8GR-FKS); 264 kW (354 hp) (LS 500h,8GR-FXS)
- Transmission: 10-speed Aisin AWR10L65 "Direct Shift-10A" automatic (LS 350 & LS 500); 10-speed Aisin AWRHM50 / L310/f "Multi Stage Electronically controlled Hybrid System" automatic (LS 500h)
- Hybrid drivetrain: Lexus Multi Stage Hybrid System (LS 500h)
- Battery: 310.8V high-voltage Lithium-ion

Dimensions
- Wheelbase: 3,125 mm (123.0 in)
- Length: 5,235 mm (206.1 in)
- Width: 1,900 mm (74.8 in)
- Height: 1,450–1,460 mm (57.1–57.5 in)
- Curb weight: 2,030–2,350 kg (4,475–5,181 lb)

=== 2017–2020 ===
Developed under the 200B program, the fifth-generation LS made its debut at the January 2017 North American International Auto Show. This model was previewed by the LF-FC concept that was first shown at the 2015 Tokyo Motor Show. It is the second Lexus model to be built on the GA-L platform, after the LC grand tourer. Dubbed as LS 500 (VXFA50/55), it is the first LS to be powered by a V6 engine. There were no plans to offer a V8 engine, as seen in previous LS models or European competitors. The 3.4-litre twin-turbo V35A-FTS V6 produces 309 kW (415 hp) and 600 N⋅m (440 lb⋅ft) of torque. The wheelbase is 34 mm (1.3 in) longer than the previous long-wheelbase model, the LS 460L. The height is also 15 mm (0.6 in) lower, with the bonnet and boot measuring 30 and 40 mm (1.2 and 1.6 in) lower, respectively.

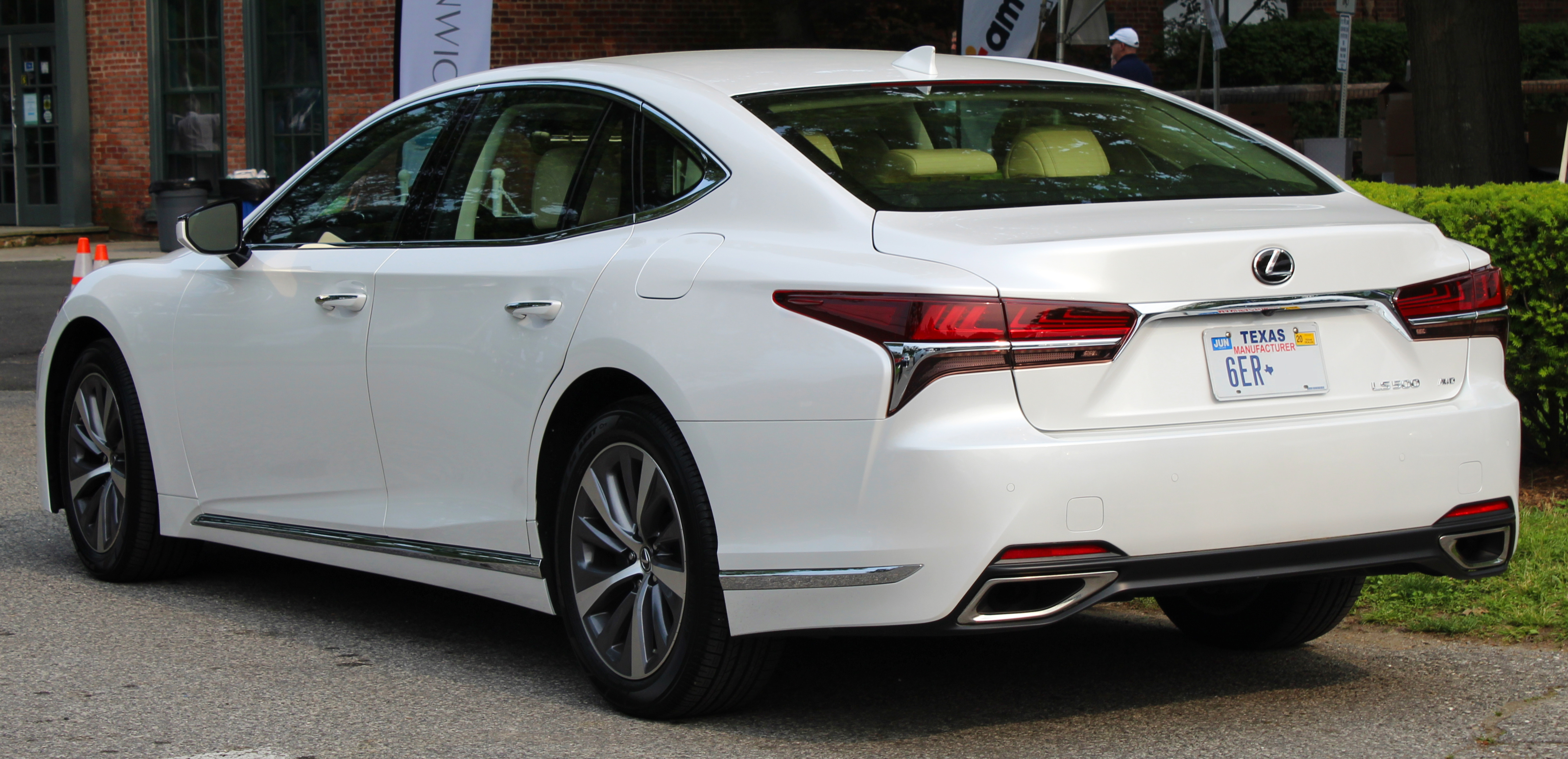
LS 500 (pre-facelift; rear)

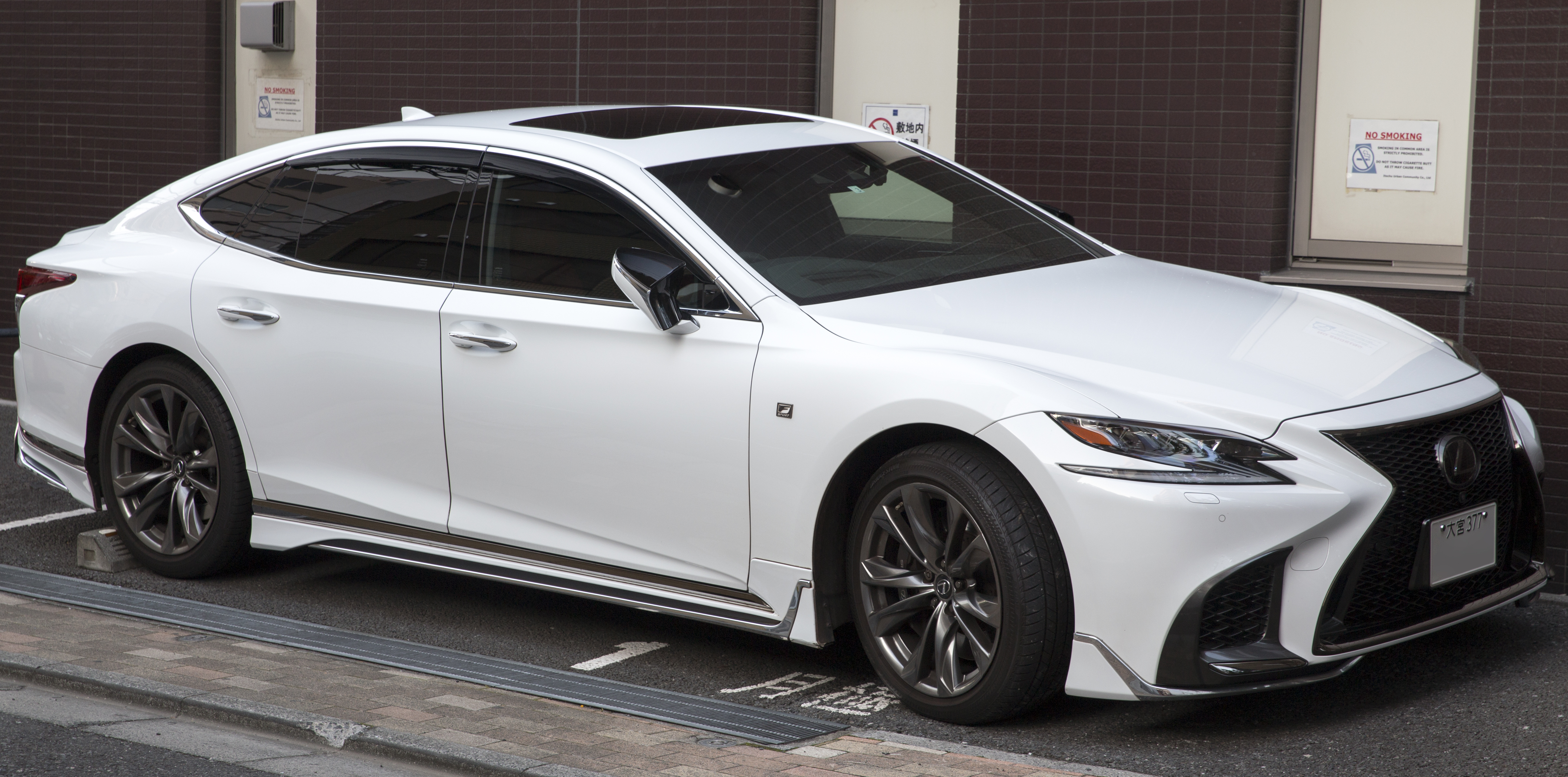
LS 500 F Sport (Japan; pre-facelift)

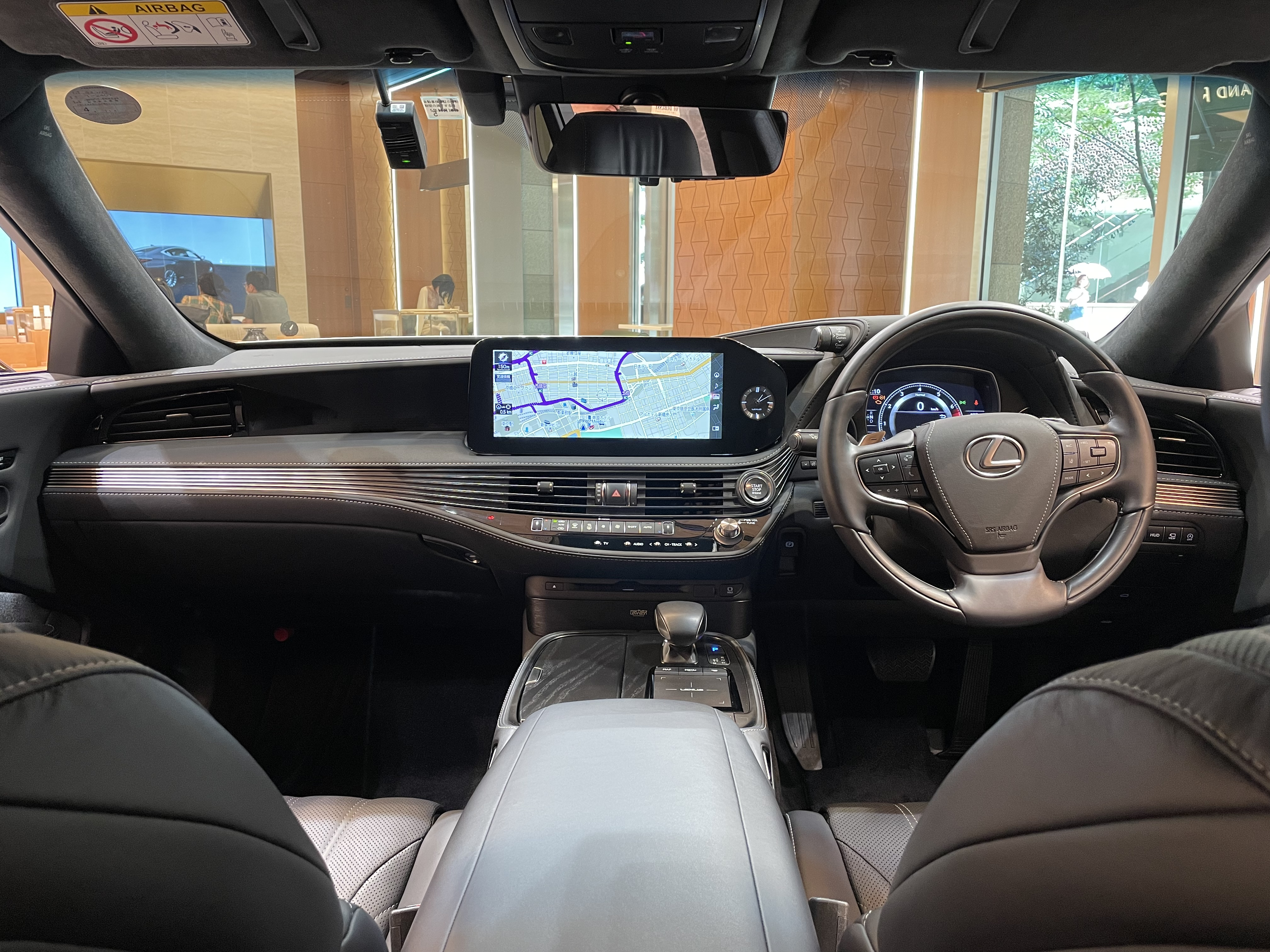
Interior

In a couple of Lexus firsts, the fifth-generation LS is the first Lexus sedan to feature a six-sided window design, while the flush-surface windows integrate smoothly with the pillars. In the company's efforts to reconcile two conflicting goals, sufficient headroom with a low roofline, the new LS employs an available outer-slide-type panoramic moonroof instead of the conventional, internally retracting item.

The fifth-generation LS also features 3D-surround Mark Levinson audio with in-ceiling array speakers. The next-generation, remote touch infotainment interface called Lexus Enform, is said to be designed to mimic smartphone operation, with support for handwritten input. Alongside the 12.3 inch navigation display, the fifth-generation LS can be specified with an optional 24 inch, colour HUD for the driver's view. The LS 500h (GVF50/55) uses the Multi Stage Hybrid System that debuted in the LC 500h. Like the LC 500h, it uses a lithium-ion battery rather than the nickel-metal hydride battery used in the previous LS 600h. Lexus Safety System+ 2.0 is fitted as standard to the LS.

At the 2017 Shenzhen, Hong Kong and Macau International Auto Shows, Lexus unveiled the Chinese-market LS 350 (GSF50), which uses a naturally aspirated 2GR-FKS V6 engine from the GS 350, producing 234 kW (318 hp) and 380 N⋅m (280 lb⋅ft) of torque. Hong Kong models uses an 8GR-FKS engine producing 232 kW (315 hp) and 380 N⋅m (280 lb⋅ft) of torque.

=== 2020–present ===
The fifth-generation LS received a facelift in 2020 for the 2021 model year. Notable improvements have been made in several areas of the vehicle. The suspension received enhancements that improves ride quality, handling and ingress/egress of the vehicle. The LS 500's 3.4-litre V6 engine has an updated piston design aimed to lower emissions and reduce NVH when the engine is cold while the hybrid variant received several hardware and software upgrades improving the acceleration of the vehicle. The interior of the LS has been further refined with revised seats, touch points, higher-resolution rearview mirror and updated leather options. The facelifted LS uses a 12.3-inch touchscreen infotainment system instead of the mouse-based implementation found in prior model years. Apple CarPlay, Android Auto and Amazon Alexa integration are standard equipment. All grades of the 2021 LS are equipped with Lexus Safety System+ 2.0 as standard and received a number of updates such as Lane Change Assist and Active Steering Assist. Exterior updates include a revised front fascia, radiator intake, headlights, taillights and updated colour options.

In Europe, the updated LS 500h was launched a few months later and the LS 500 was dropped. An update launched on 8 April 2021 includes the Advanced Drive including driver monitor camera and remote software updates. It is able to keep the vehicle in its lane, maintain the distance from other vehicles, navigate a lane split, change lanes, and overtake other vehicles. It also has Advanced Park, an advanced parking assistance system.

In 2025, the LS was discontinued in the UK due to poor sales and regulation/legislation issues. As of 2025, it continues to be sold in other parts of the world.

On 26 September 2025, for the 2026 model year, the limited production Heritage Edition was announced to mark the discontinuation of the LS in the US after 36 years. Only 250 units will be produced, with 5 units going to Canada. The LS 500 Heritage Edition is painted in a special black paint called "Ninety Noir", while it receives 20 inch 20-spoke alloy wheels in Dark Gray Metallic. Inside, the interior is done up in a bold red upholstery called "Rioja Red", meant to provide a striking contrast to the exterior color. A Lexus LS Heritage Edition emblem is etched onto the center console, featuring the silhouette of the LS, and is embroidered onto the headrests, and the Laser Special Black premium wood trim receives a new pattern. Panoramic View Monitor and a panoramic glass roof are standard on the LS Heritage Edition, while Advanced Park, heated rear seats, power lift-up buckle, and a Mark Levinson 23-speaker, 2,400 watt Reference Surround Sound system with QuantumLogic Immersion are among the included convenience and luxury features. The LS Heritage Edition will arrive at US dealers in the third quarter of 2025, and is only available in AWD configuration. The LS will continue to be available in markets outside of North America and Europe.

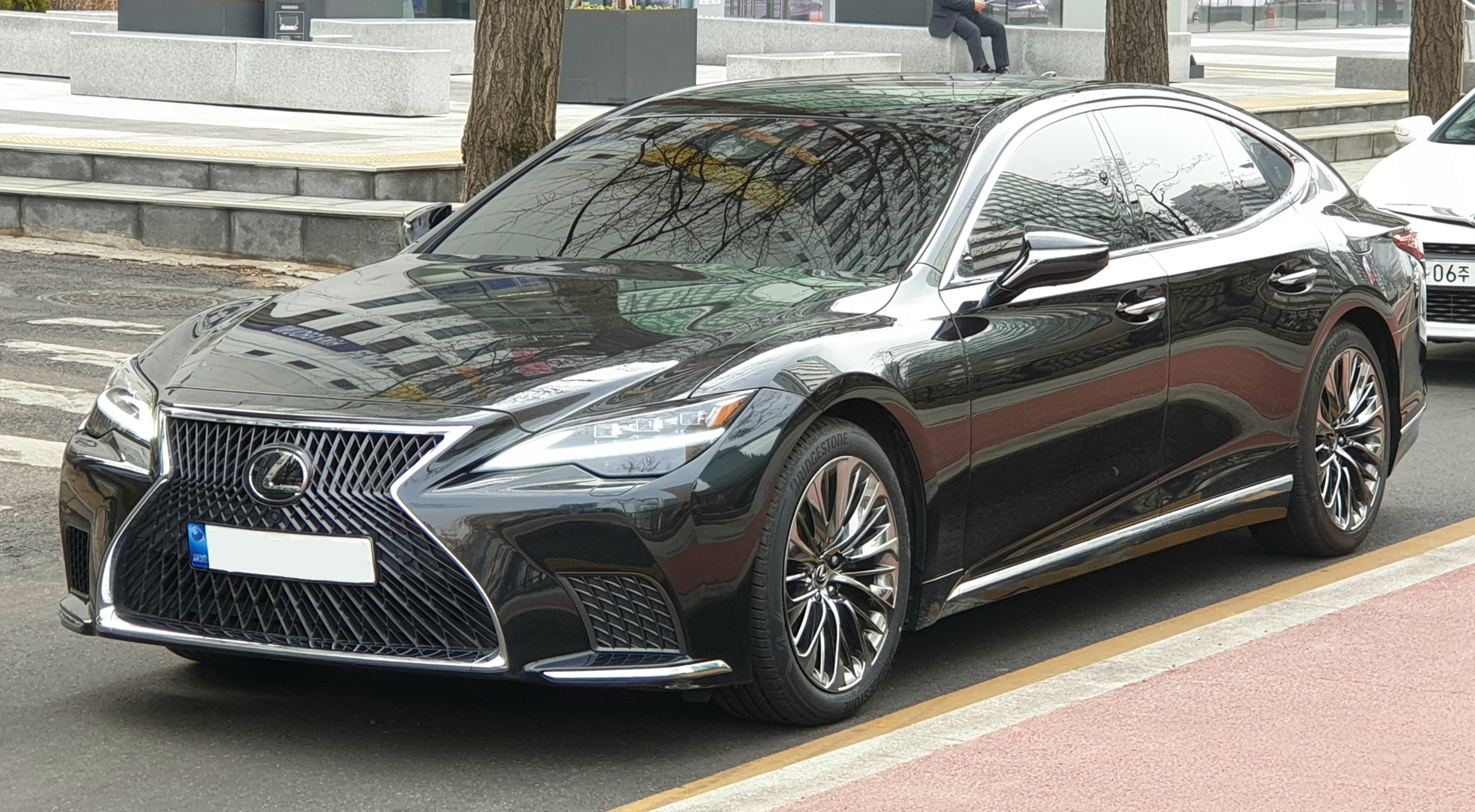
LS 500 (facelift)

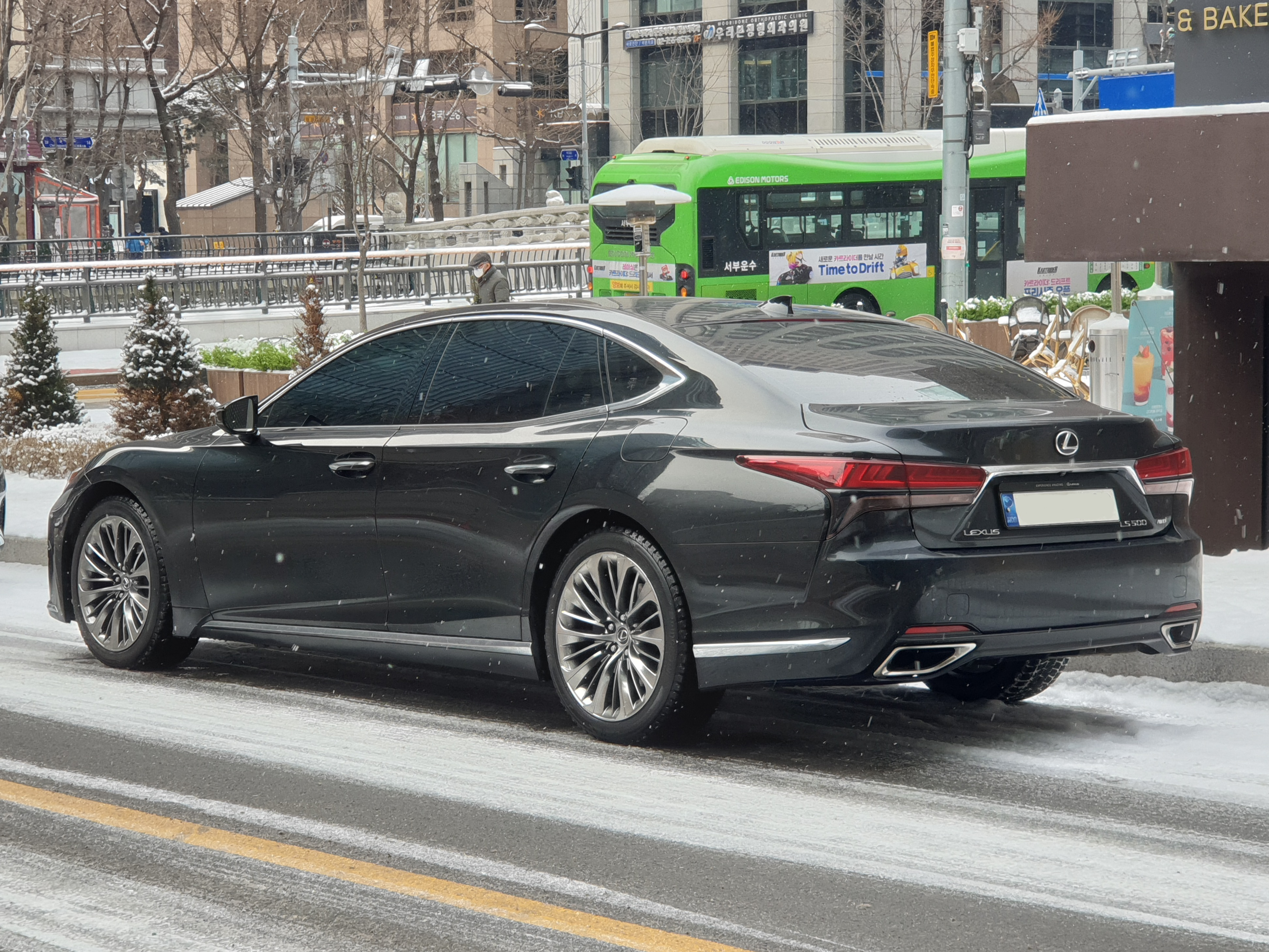
LS 500 (facelift)

== Nameplate use for other models ==
=== LS Concepts (2025) ===
The LS nameplate was used on six-wheeled MPV, coupe SUV and autonomous pod concepts in 2025. These three were showcased in 2025 Japan Mobility Show.

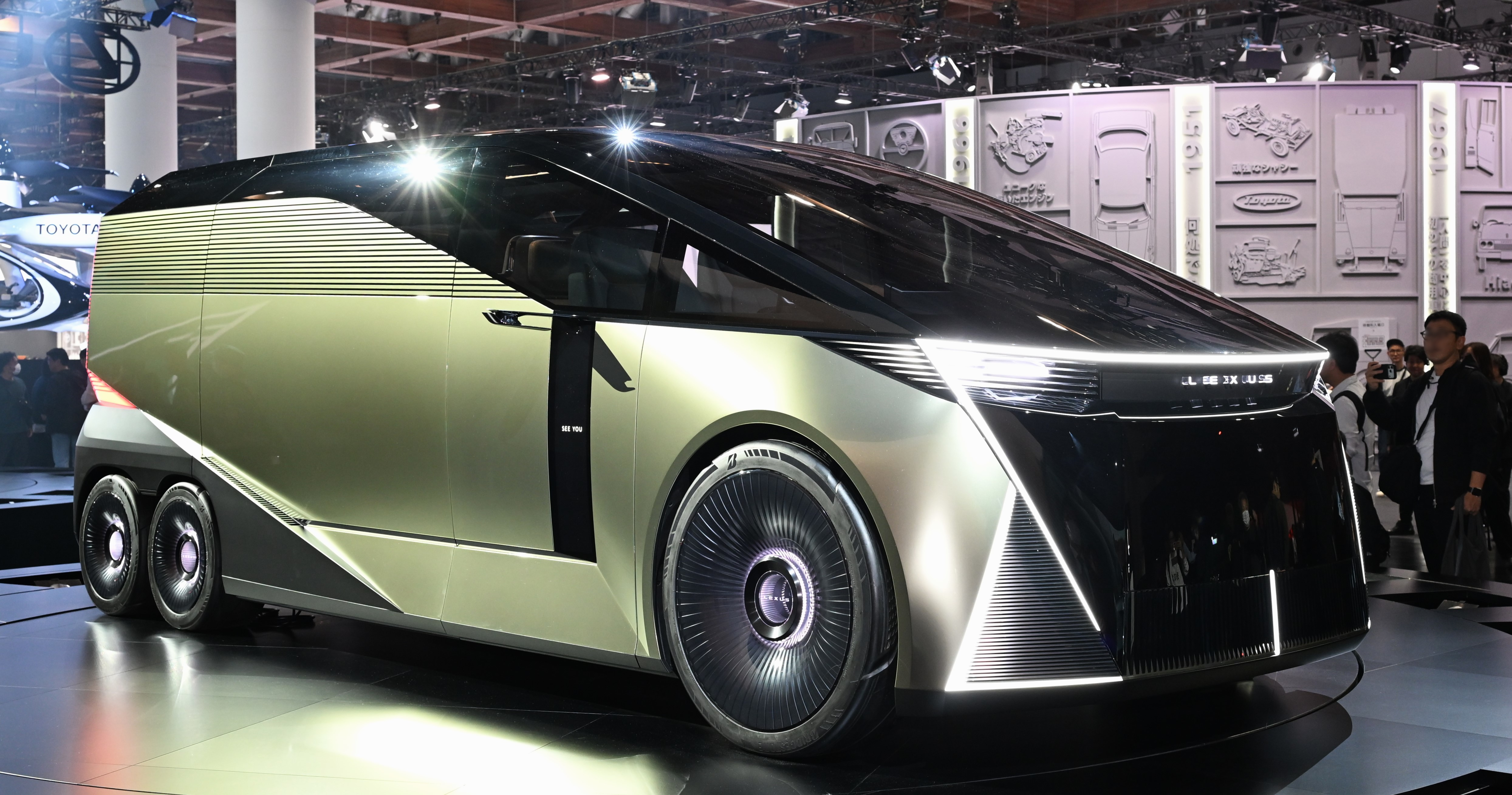
LS Concept

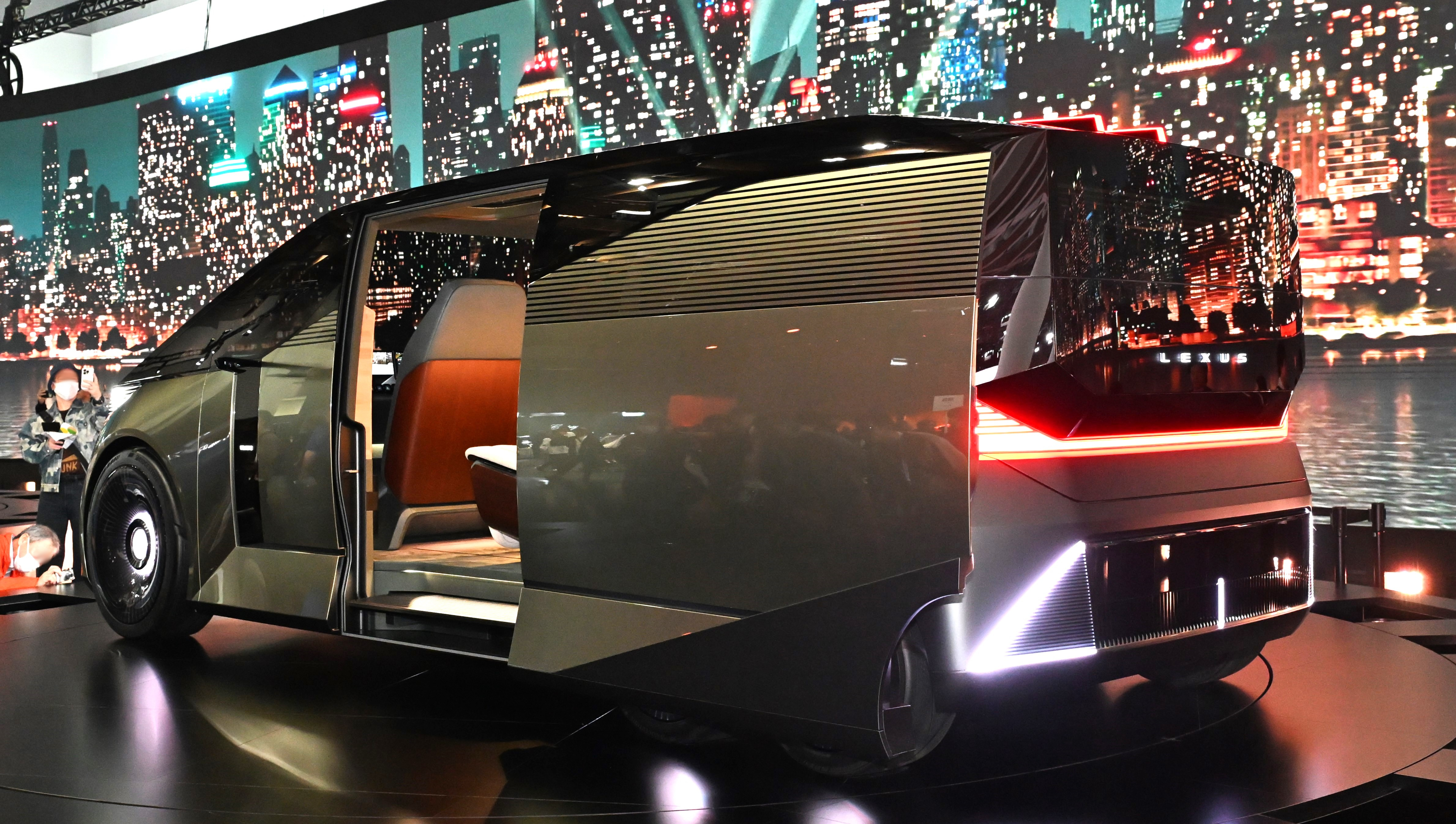
LS Concept (rear)

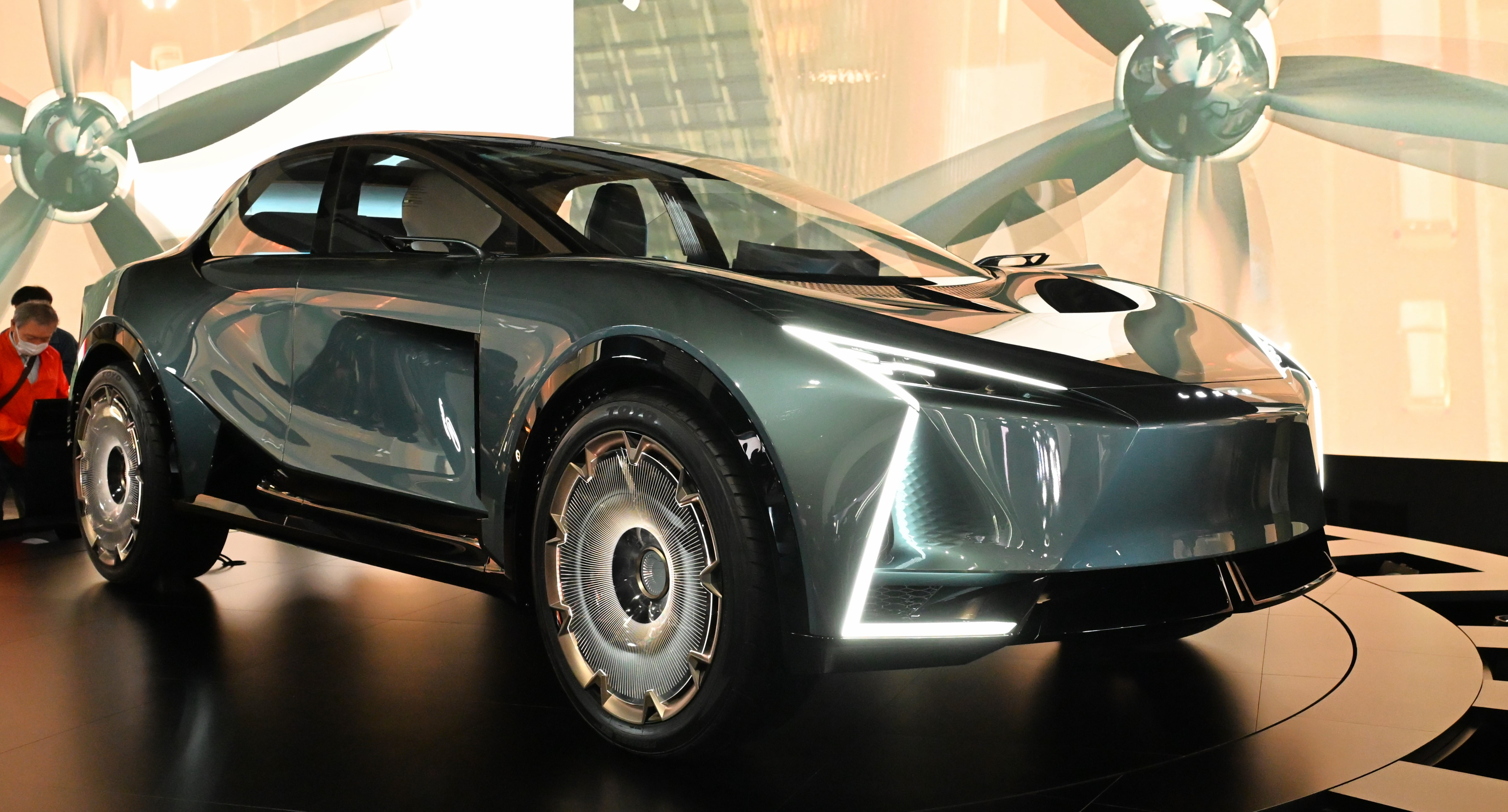
LS Coupe Concept

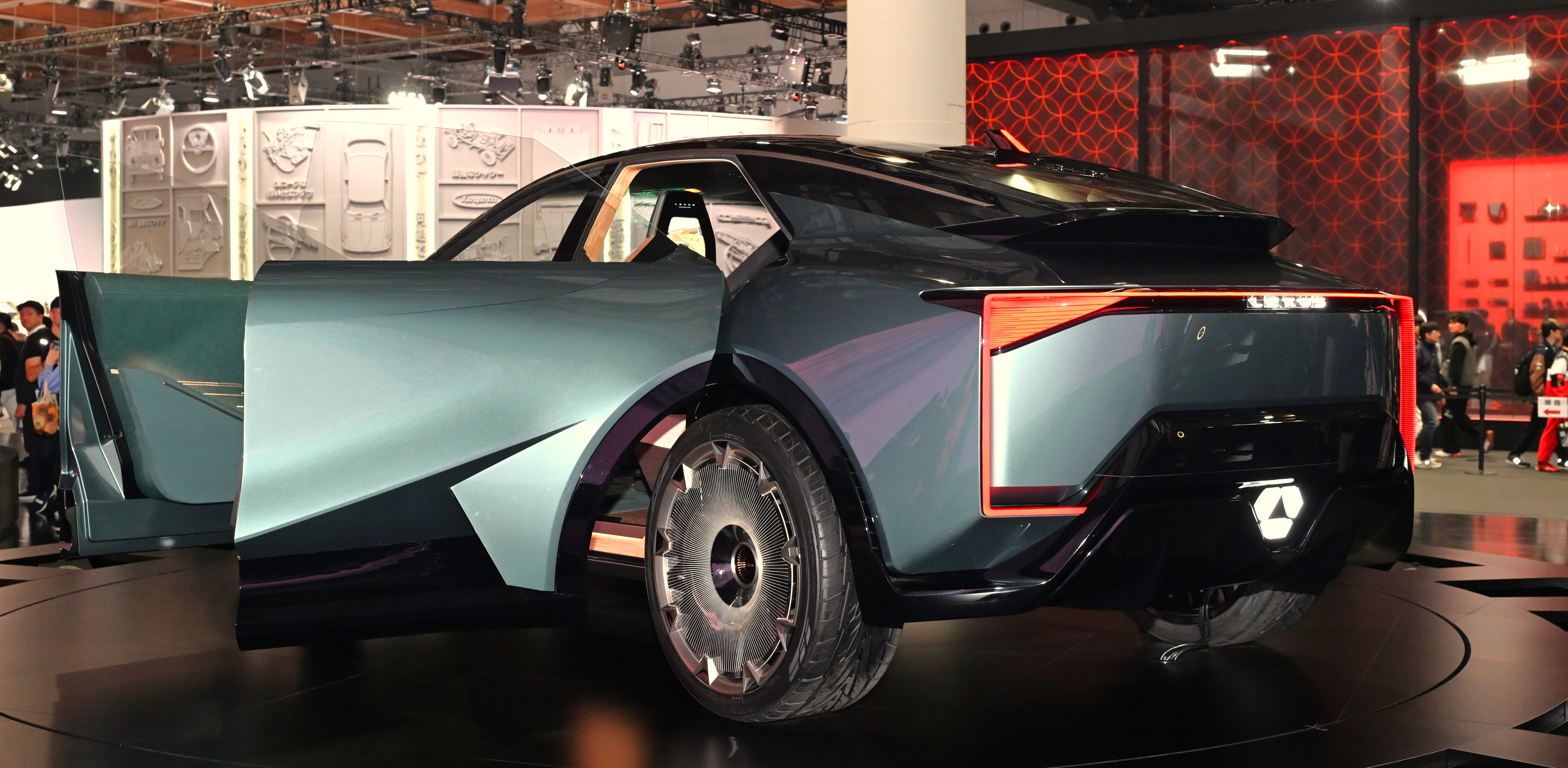
LS Coupe Concept (rear)

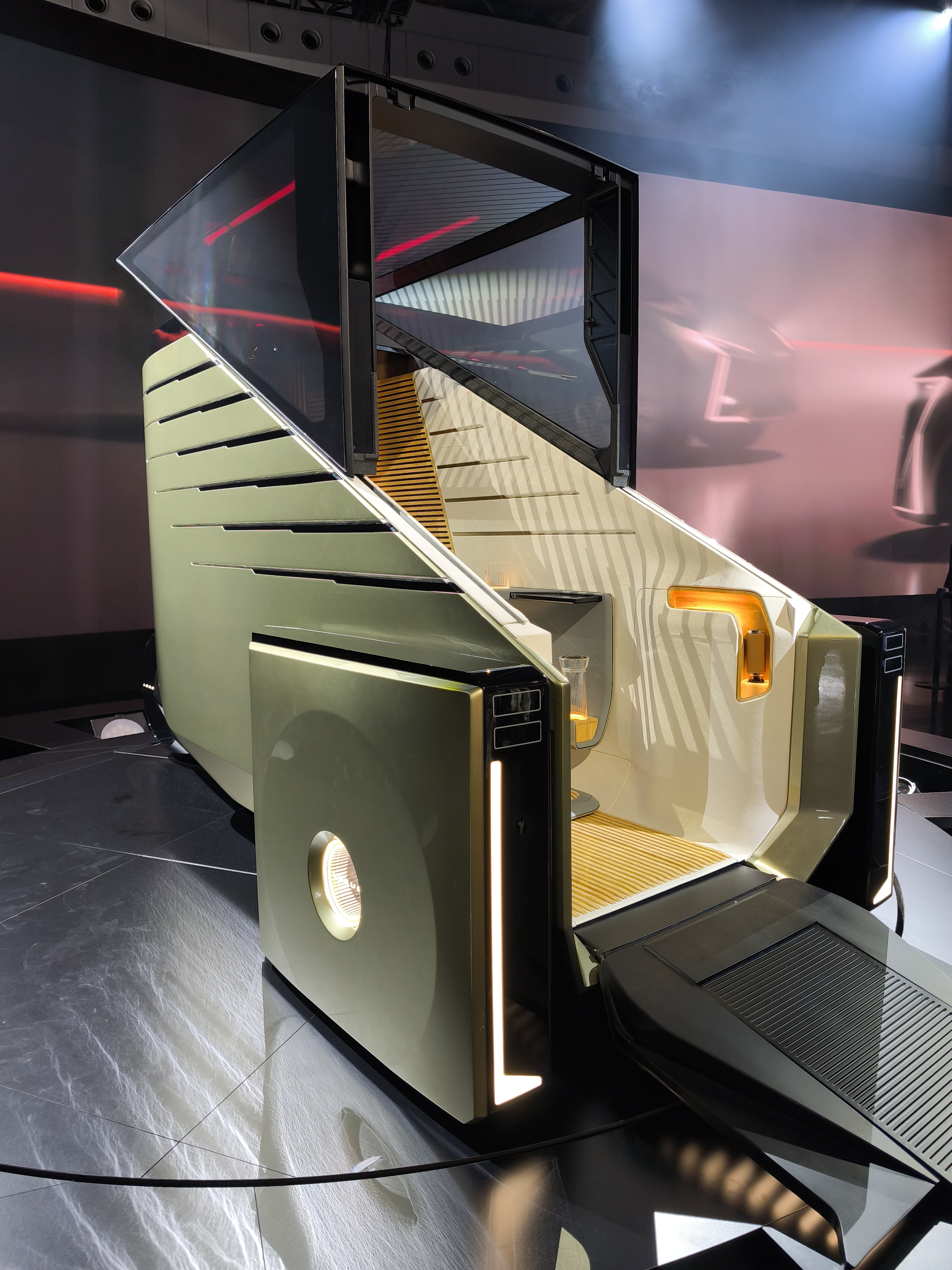
LS Micro Concept

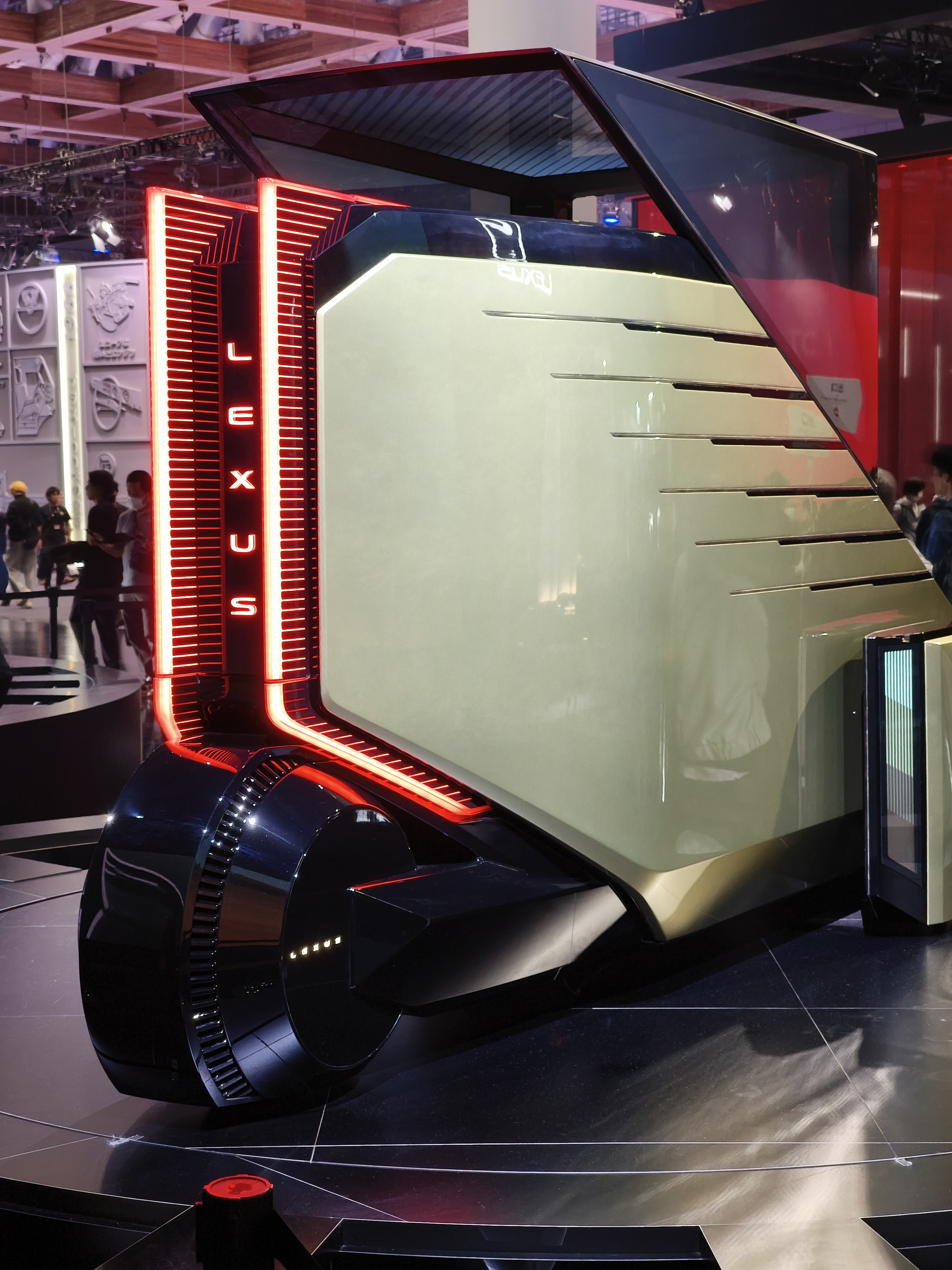
LS Micro Concept (rear)

Interior

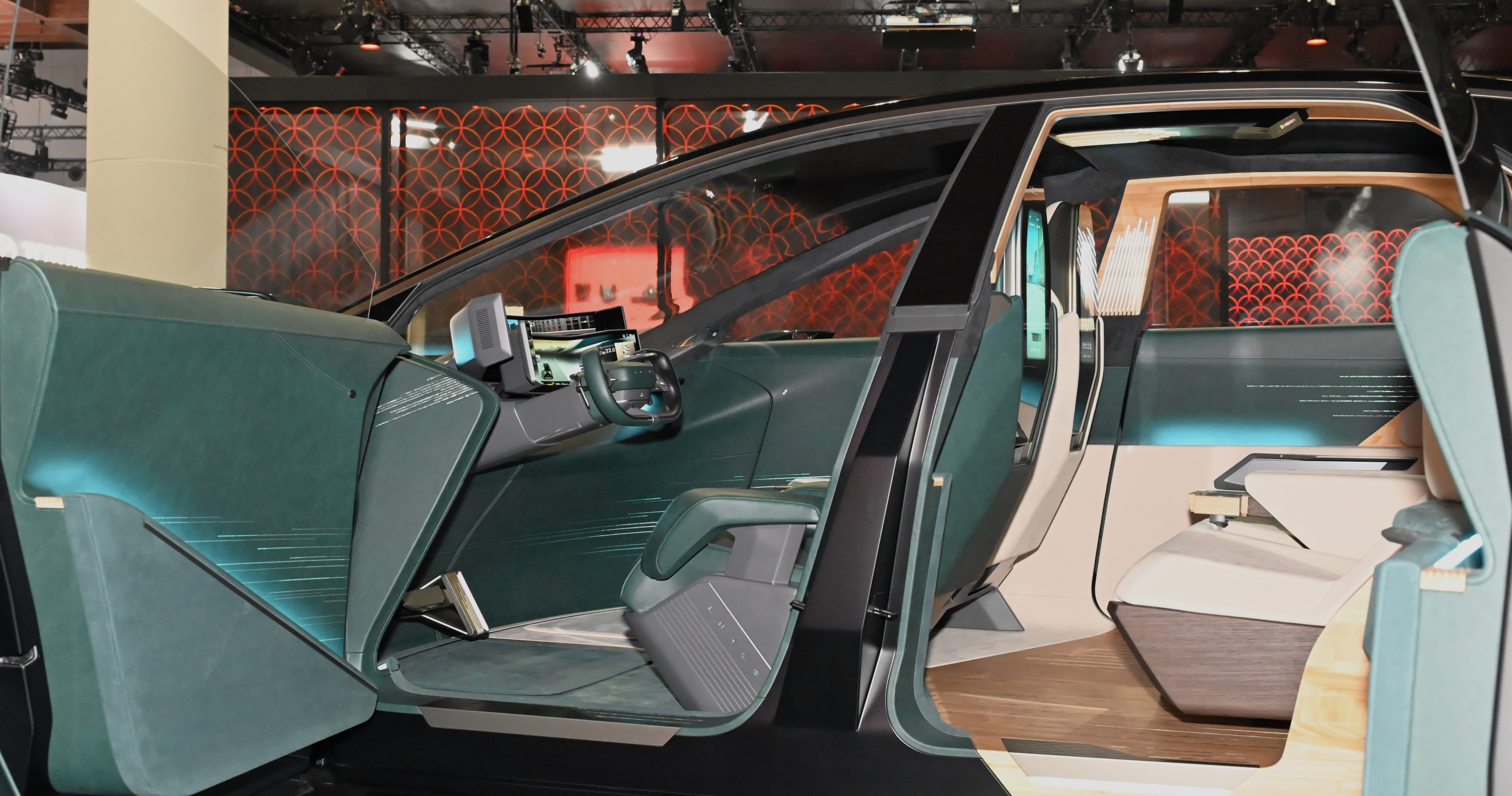
Interior (LS Coupe Concept)

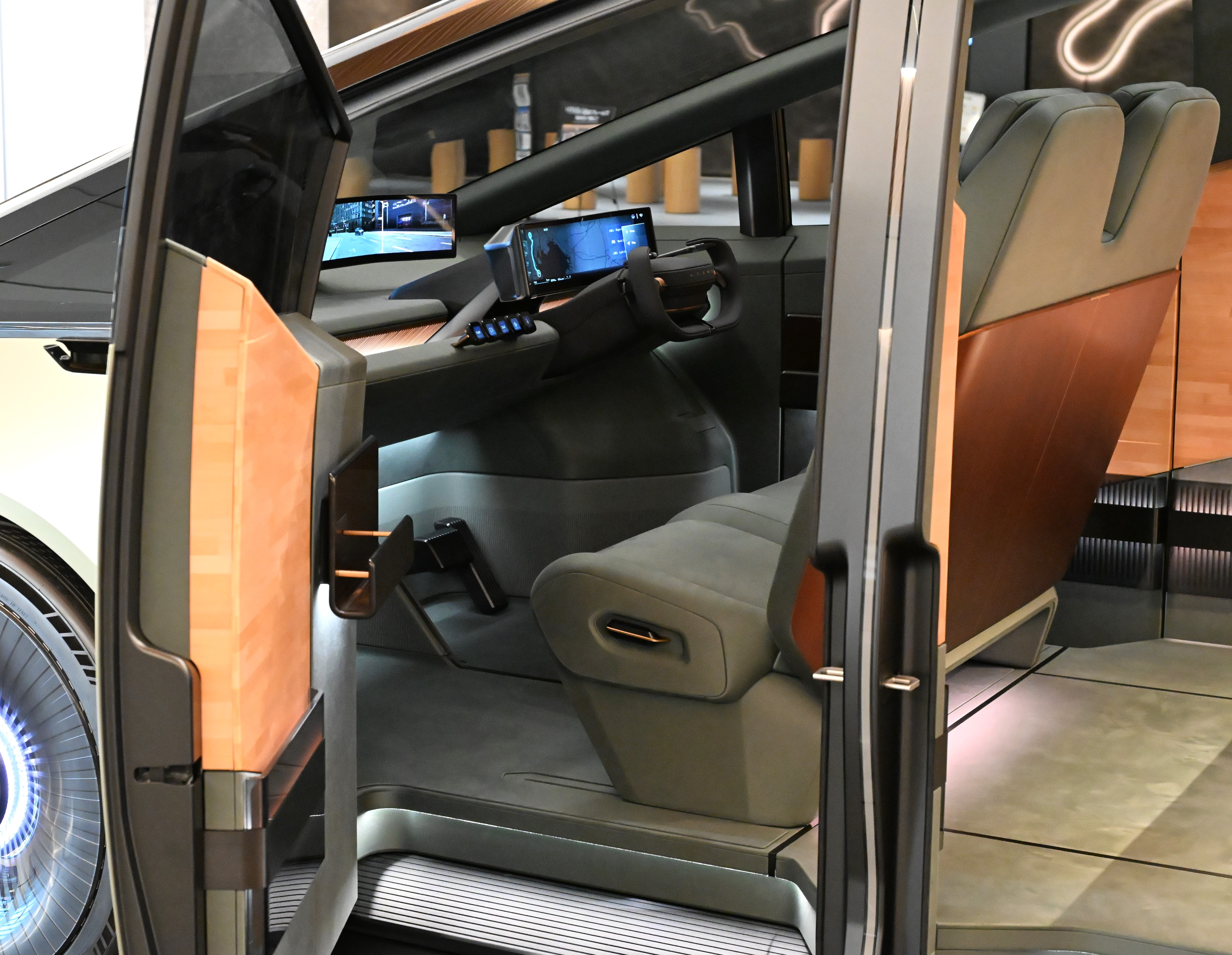
Interior (LS Concept)

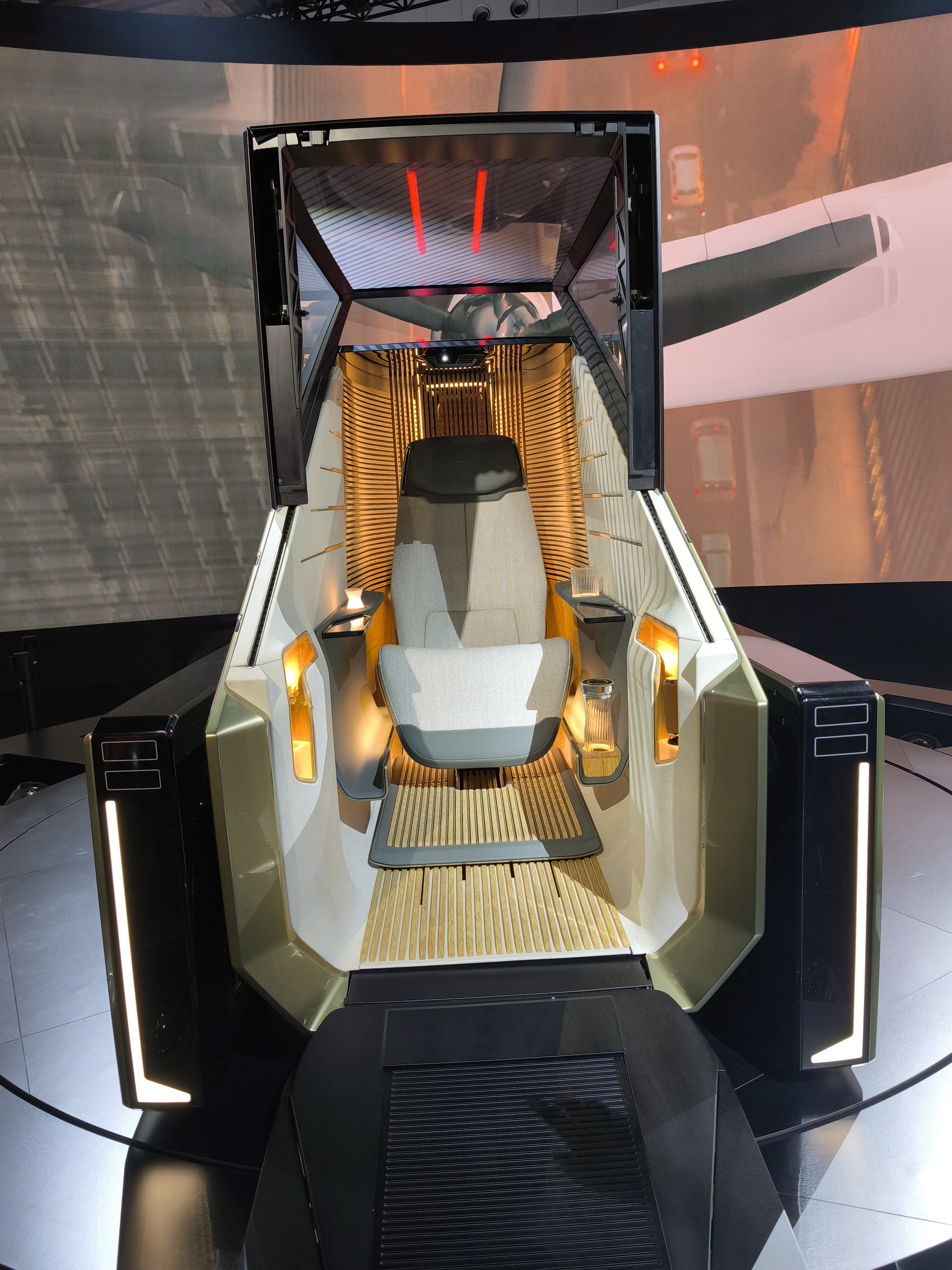
Interior (LS Micro Concept)

== Manufacturing ==
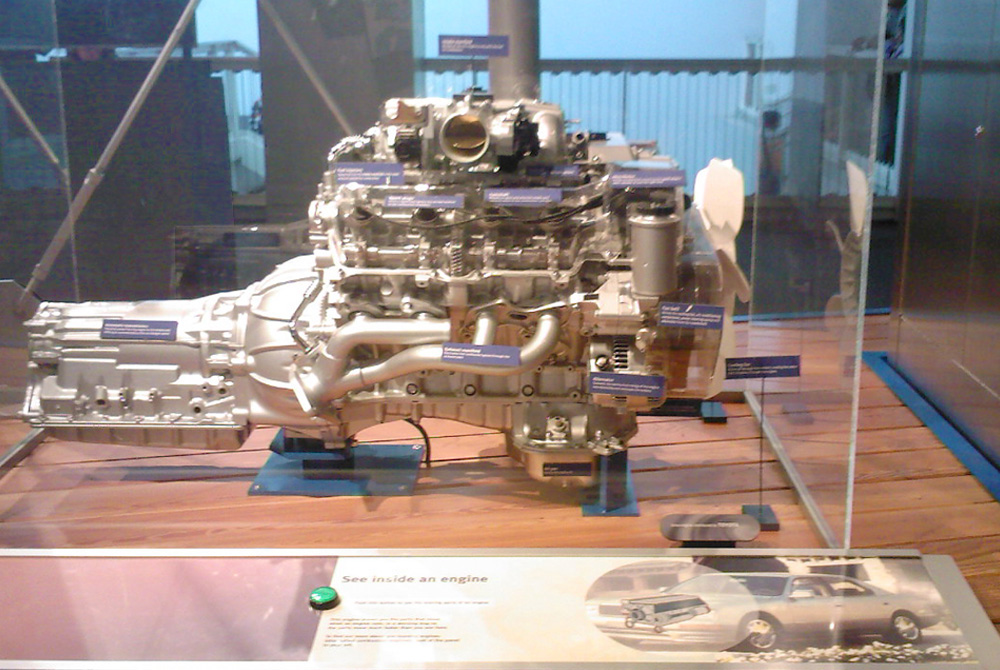
Lexus LS UZ V8 engine exhibit at the California Science Center

The Lexus LS has been consistently produced on dedicated Lexus assembly lines at Toyota's flagship Tahara factory, located in the city of Tahara, in Aichi Prefecture, Chūbu region, southwest of Nagoya, since 1989. Tahara remains the sole production site, having inaugurated its new line number four specifically for assembly of the original LS 400.

For the Lexus LS, the Tahara plant developed new molds and enhanced assembly techniques and instituted measures aimed at increasing the precision of the sedan's fit and finish. The 1989 LS 400 became the first production automobile to receive extensive laser welding, allowing for seamless steel welds. A large sheet metal press was developed to reduce or eliminate panel gaps by stamping large sections whole instead of singly. Separately installed parts, such as exterior lights, were also spring-loaded for a tighter fit. On the LS 400, engineers reduced door panel gaps in half versus Toyota-brand vehicles, from 7 to 4 mm (0.28 to 0.16 in), with measurements made within 0.01 mm (0.00039 in); on the LS 430, measurement margins were increased tenfold, to 0.001 mm (3.9×10^{−5} in). When production switched to the LS 460, the number of laser welds was doubled.

Despite Tahara's large-scale automation, Lexus LS production also involves specialized personnel who are tasked with key production points, such as testing each vehicle's V8 engine via dynamometer and stethoscope for calibration before installation. With the LS 460, a hand-sanded paint process was introduced. The production standards used on the Lexus LS were eventually adopted by the manufacturer for other vehicles; in 2007, the assembly of Toyota Corolla economy cars used the same panel gap measurements as the LS 400 did eighteen years earlier.

== Legacy of the LS400 Development ==
In the years after the LS400/Celsior went out of production in 1994, the car has continued to influence the entire world of manufacturing. The Toyota Production System largely infiltrated American manufacturing around the time MIT's IMVP academic group coined lean manufacturing, as MBA John Krafcik used his Lexus-influenced knowledge learned to model Genesis, as Hyundai-Kia themselves used TPS to become benchmarks in modern day.

Within Toyota's own development efforts, the LS400's innovative advancements spread down through the company line-up. Through leveraging sister platforms, Toyota also used the economic conditions of currency differentials to trickle down to the high standards set by the LS400. This type of reputation-setting effort was monumental and not very profitable for Toyota, but they saw it as a way to gain a sterling reputation for quality and reliability. Afterwards Toyota planners would look for ways to reduce costs in the lower models (in their next generations). For example, the MX83 Toyota Cressida was the first glimpse at the LS400 and SXV10 Camry to come following in 1992. The MX83 was a clear step up from the 2nd generation V20 Camry. Additionally, Toyota saw it as an educational experience of refinement for engineering researchers in the United States market. It was large (notably more so than V20 Camry), and was designed to be a proper mid-size American car. Toyota used the MX83 as a hollow shell to build the LS400 interior concept until that cabin was transferred to a larger, more bubble-type body shell. Extensive audio testing with Nakamichi systems was done by using LS400 prototype interiors in Cressida bodies.

As the LS400 was then refined, Toyota went through extraordinary efforts to refine the standards of the MX83 even slightly further, as fit and finish became the best in the industry. This level of fit and finish trickled down to the 1992 XV10 Toyota Camry/Lexus ES300 shared platform. The 1992 Camry shocked the industry as it was only a non-luxury midsize family sedan (in base non-XLE trims, at least). However, the complex flushed window stamping and flowing one-piece roof were modeled from new processes learned by Toyota making the LS400, as were the triple sealing framed doors. To accomplish this, the doors use indented rubber gaskets to seal the door in a fashion similar to that used by Tupperware food containers. There were no other mid-size sedans built to such fit and finish standards, except the high-end German BMW 5-series and Mercedes-Benz E-class cars. This point was made by Chris Goffey during BBC's 1991 Motorfair Top Gear coverage.

Principles such as Heijunka boards, andon pull cords, and Gemba walking have become embedded in aerospace engineering production at Boeing and its subsidiaries. The Federal Aviation Administration lists the FV2400-2TC (a 1UZ-FE derivative) as aviation certified. Intel modeled the "Internet of Things" on what was learned from Toyota's LS 400 quality standards.

== Industrial significance ==
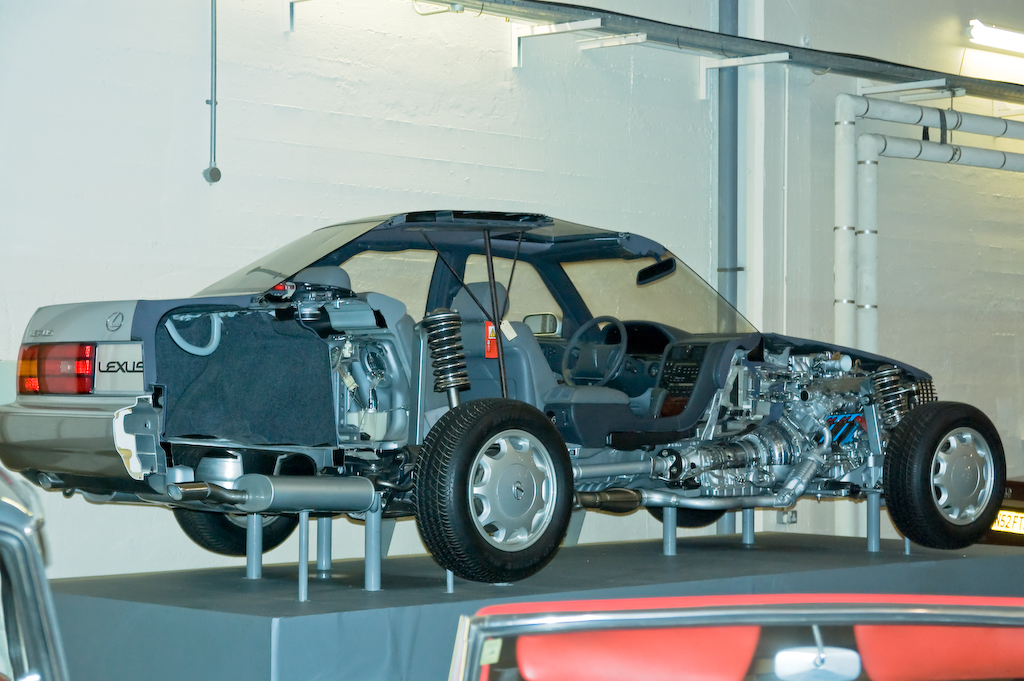
LS 400 cutaway model displaying internal construction at the Wroughton Classic

The Lexus LS marked a successful entrant of a Japanese manufacturer into the prestige luxury arena, after the first Honda (Acura) Legend, a market that had long been dominated by established European and American brands. By 1991, with the LS 400 its top-selling model, Lexus had overtaken Mercedes-Benz and BMW in overall U.S. sales, and in 2000, the marque passed Cadillac as the luxury sales leader in the largest automotive market. Rival manufacturers responded with lower prices and added features. In particular, Mercedes-Benz reorganized its operations, shifting to a targeted-cost process similar to Lexus production methods, and dropped competing U.S. base prices by nearly 10 percent. To rival the LS 400, extra features were rushed for the launch of the 1991 Mercedes-Benz S-Class (W140), causing budget overruns and costing the job of Daimler-Benz's chief engineer, Wolfgang Peter. Approximately 5 percent of 1989 LS 400 sales went to buyers employed by rival manufacturers, including GM, Ford, and Chrysler. When the LS 400 was disassembled for engineering analysis, Cadillac engineers concluded that the vehicle could not be built using existing GM methods. Industry publications noted the LS 400's precise panel gaps, and the subject became a common evaluation standard in road tests. The LS 430's interior noise level was later used by rival makes as a measure of cabin quietness.

According to industry observers, the introduction of the Lexus LS reshaped Toyota's image from that of an "econobox" manufacturer to the builder of an automotive standard bearer. This stood in contrast to the predictions of early detractors, including rival manufacturers who dismissed Toyota as incapable of producing a competitive luxury vehicle. Japanese contemporaries from the luxury divisions of Honda (Acura) and Nissan (Infiniti) had differing degrees of success. Honda had entered into a joint venture with Britain's Austin Rover Group in November 1981, launching Project XX with an Austin Rover–Honda XX letter of intent to replace the Rover SD1 with the Rover 800 and to provide a midsize, V6-powered luxury sedan for Honda, called the Honda Legend. Marketed as the Acura Legend in the U.S., the sedan initially sold well, but subsequent models (renamed Acura RL) performed below sales expectations. Launched by Nissan in December 1989, the V8-powered Infiniti Q45 closely rivaled the LS 400 in specifications and price, but was unsuccessful in sales (attributed to unconventional styling and marketing), leading to its discontinuation in 2006. The success of the Lexus LS became a test case for mainstream manufacturers targeting upscale segments. By investing in a separate marque, Toyota was able to avoid the stigma attached to a mass-market brand's charging premium prices. The effect of the LS 400 on the automotive industry led Automobile magazine to add the sedan to its "24 Most Important Vehicles of the 20th Century" list in 1996.

== Sales and production ==
In its largest market, the U.S., the Lexus LS was the top-selling flagship luxury sedan for 15 of the first 17 years following its debut. In Japan, the next-largest market for the Lexus LS, the introduction of the 2007 LS 460 attracted 12,000 pre-orders, and the Lexus LS has gone on to sell successfully in its class. Following the introduction of the LS 460 and Lexus' expanded global launch in 2007, sales of the Lexus flagship have increasingly come from outside the brand's traditional U.S. strongholds. By 2007, the Lexus LS ranked second globally in flagship sales, next to the Mercedes-Benz S-Class' 85,500 units, with 71,760 Lexus LS sedans sold worldwide, and over half the total coming from outside the U.S. market. In 2008, U.S. sales fell 42% amidst the late-2000s recession, mirroring the overall decline of the luxury car market.

The Lexus LS has not sold as well in Europe, where Lexus suffers from smaller brand recognition, image, and a less-developed dealership network. In European markets, the Lexus LS has ranked behind Jaguar, Mercedes-Benz, Audi, and BMW in flagship luxury car sales. Automotive analysts have suggested a possible rationale for the sales disparity, in that European buyers place less emphasis on vehicle reliability and have more brand loyalty to established domestic marques. In contrast, the Lexus LS has ranked second in sales to the Mercedes-Benz S-Class (and ahead of rivals from BMW, Audi, and Jaguar) in markets outside Europe, such as South Africa.

Calendar year	Sales			Exports, production^{‡}
Calendar year	US	China	Global	Exports, production^{‡}
1989	11,574			
1990	42,806			41,901
1991	36,955			41,228
1992	32,561			32,472
1993	23,783			28,187
1994	22,443			21,390
1995	23,657			22,433
1996	22,237			22,810
1997	19,618			17,782
1998	20,790			22,730
1999	16,357			17,198
2000	15,871			11,098
2001	31,110			31,473
2002	26,261			27,033
2003	23,895			21,461
2004	32,272			31,697
2005	26,043			28,902
2006	19,546		34,833	30,908^{‡}
2007	35,226		71,760	72,279^{‡}
2008	20,255			31,823^{‡}
2009	11,334			18,369^{‡}
2010	12,275			
2011	9,568			
2012	8,345		17,578^{‡}	
2013	10,727			
2014	8,559			
2015	7,165			
2016	5,514			
2017	4,094			
2018	9,302			
2019	5,528			
2020	3,617			
2021	3,739			
2022	2,679			
2023	2,237	948		
2024	2,163	561		
2025	1,082	336		

== Awards ==
Notable examples of awards received by the Lexus LS include (2007) World Car of the Year, International Car of the Year, (1991) Canadian Car of the Year, Wheels Car of the Year, and Top Gear Limousine of the Year. The Lexus LS has been the highest-rated luxury car in Automobile Magazine, Car and Driver, Consumer Reports, Fleet World, and MotorWeek. In J.D. Power's long-term Vehicle Dependability Study, the Lexus LS has been the most reliable car for fifteen consecutive years, the most for any manufacturer, and Consumer Reports has ranked the sedan as the most reliable vehicle tested. Safety awards include Auto Bild's 2007 Innovation Prize for the LS 460 pre-collision system, consecutive first place rankings in the What Car? Security Supertest, and Kiplinger's "Best in Safety for Cars $40,000 and Over". Technical honors range from Ward's 10 Best Engines, to Edmunds.com's "Best Sound System in Cars Over $30,000".

In U.S. consumer publications, Lexus' flagship model is recognized as one of the most reliable vehicles ever built, having held the top ranking in J.D. Power and Associates' U.S. Vehicle Dependability Survey for fifteen consecutive years (1994–2009), again in 2012, third place in 2013, and top again in 2014. A 1996 Lexus LS400 owned by an automotive journalist has surpassed a million miles on what is believed to be its original engine.
