= Reversing (vehicle maneuver) =

Vehicle maneuver

A two-trailer vehicle driving backwards

Reversing (also known as backing up) is the process of driving a vehicle in the reverse direction in order to maneuver. Rear view mirrors are somewhat standard equipment for this endeavor.

Reversing a vehicle is used as an intermediate step to complete a three point turn, J-turn, parallel park, or similar maneuver. These moves are used with the goal of positioning the vehicle in a specific way under certain space restrictions, that would not be possible to achieve whilst only moving forward.

Extremely large or luxury vehicles may have in addition technical aids such as backup cameras.

Many industrial vehicles such as fork lifts automatically activate a repetitive warning beep whilst reversing. In the UK, trucks (lorries) may be fitted with warning devices which repeatedly announce "Attention: this vehicle is reversing", or the equivalent phrase in Welsh: "Mae'r cerbyd yn mynd yn ôl". Harmonization of reverse warning sound of vehicles is planned by an adopted UNECE regulation for entry into force in January 2023. According to this regulation, "Audible reverse warning device" means a device, emitting an acoustic signal to the outside of a vehicle while reversing, which is intended to give audible warning of the presence of a vehicle.

== See also ==
- Backup camera
- Blind spot monitor
- Parking sensor
- Rear-view mirror
- Side-view mirror
- Vehicle blind spot
