= Backup (disambiguation) =

Backup is the computing function of making copies of data to enable recovery from data loss.

Backup may also refer to:

== Information technology ==
- Backup (backup software), Apple Mac software
- Backup and Restore, Windows software
- Backup software, the software that performs this function
- List of backup software, specific software packages, loosely categorized
- Backup site, part of a disaster recovery plan

== Electrical power facilities ==
- Battery backup, the use of batteries to continue operation of electrical devices in the absence of utility electric power
- Backup battery, similar to above
- Backup generator, the use of a generator to achieve a similar purpose

== Music ==
- Backup band, a band who plays music in support of a lead musician
- Backing vocalist, one who sings in harmony with a "lead vocalist"
- "Back Up" (Danity Kane song), 2006
- "Back Up" (Pitbull song), 2004
- "Back Up" (Dej Loaf song), feat. Big Sean, 2015
- "Back Up" (Snoop Dogg song), 2015
- "Back Up", a song by Yeat from Afterlyfe, 2023

== Motor vehicle ==
- Backup camera, a camera on the rear of a vehicle, used while moving backwards
- Back-up collision, a type of car accident
- Backing up, driving a vehicle in reverse gear

== Others ==
- Back-up goaltender, an ice hockey team's second-string goaltender
- Backup (TV series), a BBC series about a police Operational Support Unit
- Backup, a 2009 video game by Gregory Weir
- Backup, in sports, a substitute player for a player in the starting lineup
