= Back-up collision =

When a car reverses into an object

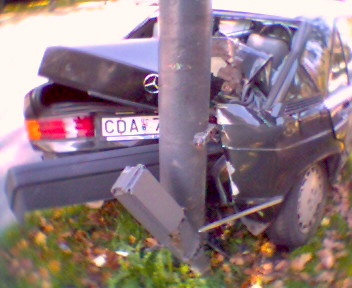
Back-up collision with a lamppost

Back-up collisions happen when a driver reverses the car into an object, person, or other car. Although most cars come equipped with rear view mirrors which are adequate for detecting vehicles behind a car, they are inadequate on many vehicles for detecting small children or objects close to the ground, which fall in the car's blind spot, particularly directly aft. That area has been called a "killing zone." Large trucks have much larger blind spots that can hide entire vehicles and large adults.

== Statistics ==
According to research by an advocacy web site, back up collisions were the leading cause (34%) for U.S. non-traffic fatalities of children under 15 from 2006–2010.

The U.S. Centers for Disease Control reported that from 2001–2003, an estimated 7,475 children (CI = 4,453–10,497) (2,492 per year) under the age of 15 were treated for automobile back-over incidents. About 300 fatalities per year result from backup collisions.

The U.S. National Highway Traffic Safety Administration found that back-up collisions most often:

- occur in residential driveways and parking lots
- involve sport utility vehicles (SUVs) or small trucks
- occur when a parent, relative or someone known to the family is driving
- particularly affect children less than five years old

The driver of the car backing up and hitting an object, a person, another car, or property is usually considered to be at fault.

== Prevention and regulation ==
Prevention organizations suggest that parents use common sense, and also take safety measures such as installing cross view mirrors, audible collision detectors, backup camera, or some type of reverse backup sensors. Furthermore, safer backing up is done when the driver turns completely around and looks out of the rear window of the car, rather than relying on mirrors. This provides a wider field of vision and better control of the vehicle.

In the United States, the Cameron Gulbransen Kids Transportation Safety Act of 2007 required the federal Secretary of Transportation to issue backup collision safety regulations within 3 years and require full compliance within 4 years after final rulemaking. As of 2012, regulations are still under study. About half of model year 2012 automobiles already have backup cameras installed.

== Blind spot monitors and other technology ==
Blind spot monitors are an option that may include more than monitoring the sides of the vehicle. It can include "Cross Traffic Alert," "which alerts drivers backing out of a parking space when traffic is approaching from the sides."

== See also ==
- Advanced driver-assistance systems
- Automatic parking
- Backup camera
- Blind spot monitor
- Blind spot (vehicle)
- Car safety
- Collision avoidance system
- Dry steering
- Experimental Safety Vehicle (ESV)
- Intelligent Parking Assist System
- Intelligent car
- Lane departure warning system
- Laser rangefinder
- Objects in mirror are closer than they appear
- Omniview technology
- Parking
- Parking sensors
- Precrash system
- Rear-view mirror
- Side-view mirror
- Sonar
- Vehicular automation
- Wing mirror
