= Vehicle blind spot =

Area around vehicle that cannot be directly observed by the driver while at the controls

A-pillar blind spot

A vehicle blind spot (VBS) or simply blind spot is an area around a vehicle that cannot be directly seen by the driver while at the controls, under existing circumstances. In transport, driver visibility is the maximum distance at which the driver of a vehicle can see and identify prominent objects around the vehicle. Visibility is primarily determined by weather conditions (see visibility) and by a vehicle's design. The parts of a vehicle that influence visibility include the windshield, the dashboard and the pillars. Good driver visibility is essential to safe road traffic.

== Conditions for blind spots ==
After decades of decline, US pedestrian deaths have increased since 2009. A New York Times study concluded that higher hoods and larger vehicle blind spots from progressively larger pickups and SUVs is responsible for part of the increase.

Traffic sign is used in some countries to warn of a blind spot.

Blind spots exist in a wide range of vehicles: aircraft, cars, buses, trucks, agricultural equipment, heavy equipment, boats, ships, trams and trains. Blind spots may occur in the front of the driver when the A-pillar (also called the windshield pillar), side-view mirror, or interior rear-view mirror block a driver's view of the road. Behind the driver, cargo, headrests, and additional pillars may reduce visibility. Proper adjusting of mirrors and using other technical solutions can eliminate or alleviate vehicle blind spots.

A no zone is one of several areas around a large truck, where the truck driver cannot see. Collisions frequently occur in no zones.

A blind zone is one of several areas around heavier rolling stocks (locomotives and multiple units), where the train driver cannot see. Accidents frequently occur in blind zones.

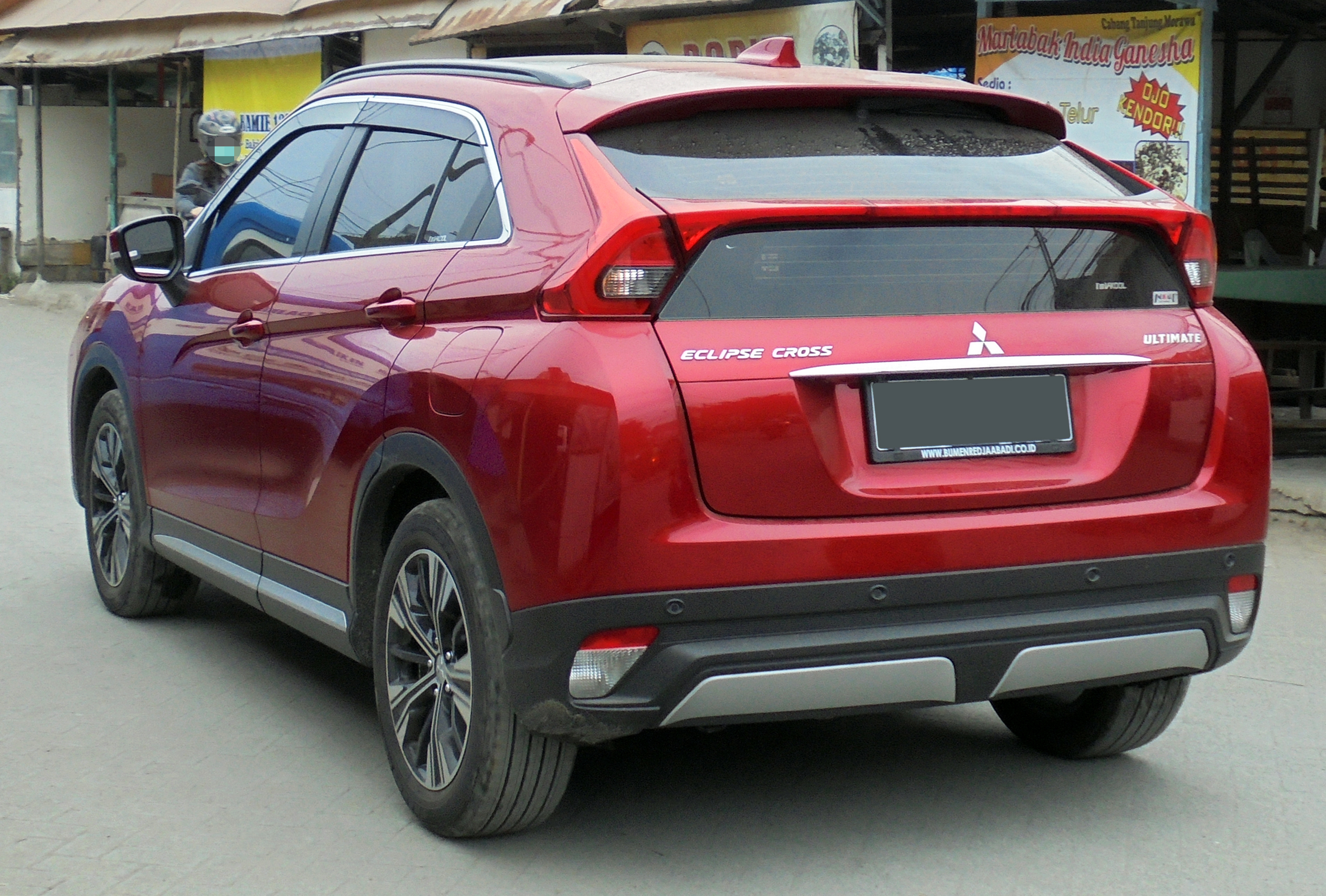
A split rear window blind spot on a Mitsubishi Eclipse Cross

== Adjusting mirrors to reduce side blind spots ==
The side view mirrors of a car should be adjusted to reduce blind spots on the sides. The method is frequently overlooked in driver's education classes and takes some getting used to. Calculated elimination of blind spots by properly trained drivers is inexpensive and obviates the need for costly technological solutions to that problem, provided drivers take the time to set up and use their mirrors effectively. The arrangement—pointing the side-view mirrors substantially outboard in a fixed mechanical formula—is relatively simple to achieve. Still, it takes some knowledgeable effort and getting used to it. It is reputed to be a lifesaver.

However, one source considers that method a driving mistake and claims it is even more dangerous than not using it, because it creates other blind spots directly behind the vehicle—nine reasons are listed, e.g., when backing up—which are impossible to eliminate by a "shoulder check".

Rearward invisibility is an entirely different matter. The area directly behind vehicles is the source of backup collisions, particularly involving pedestrians, children, and objects directly aft of a vehicle. That area has been called a "killing zone". These problems are the object of several technological solutions, including (in rough order of technological complexity, simplest first): rear-view mirror, side-view mirror, Fresnel lens, sonar, parking sensors, and backup camera. A similar problem attaches to positions left and right of a vehicle's rear bumper as the driver attempts to back out of a parking space. Specially designed cross-traffic alert warning systems have been developed to address these.

== Motor vehicles ==
The blue car's driver sees the green car through the mirrors but cannot see the red car without turning to check the blind spot. (The mirrors are not properly adjusted.)

As one is driving an automobile, blind spots are the areas of the road that cannot be seen while looking forward or through either the rear-view or side mirrors (expecting that the side mirrors are properly adjusted on a passenger auto – see above). The most common are the rear quarter blind spots, areas towards the rear of the vehicle on both sides. Vehicles in the adjacent lanes of the road that fall into these blind spots may not be visible using only the car's mirrors. Rear quarter blind spots can be:

- checked by turning one's head briefly (risking rear-end collisions),
- reduced by installing mirrors with larger fields-of-view, or
- eliminated by reducing overlap between side and rear-view mirrors by adjusting side mirrors so the side of the car is barely visible when your head is between the front seats (for the passenger-side mirror) and almost touching the driver's window (for the driver-side mirror), then checking to be sure you can see cars approaching from behind on either side when on the highway.

Other areas that are sometimes called blind spots are those that are too low to see behind, in front, or to the sides of a vehicle, especially those with a high seating point.

=== Forward visibility ===
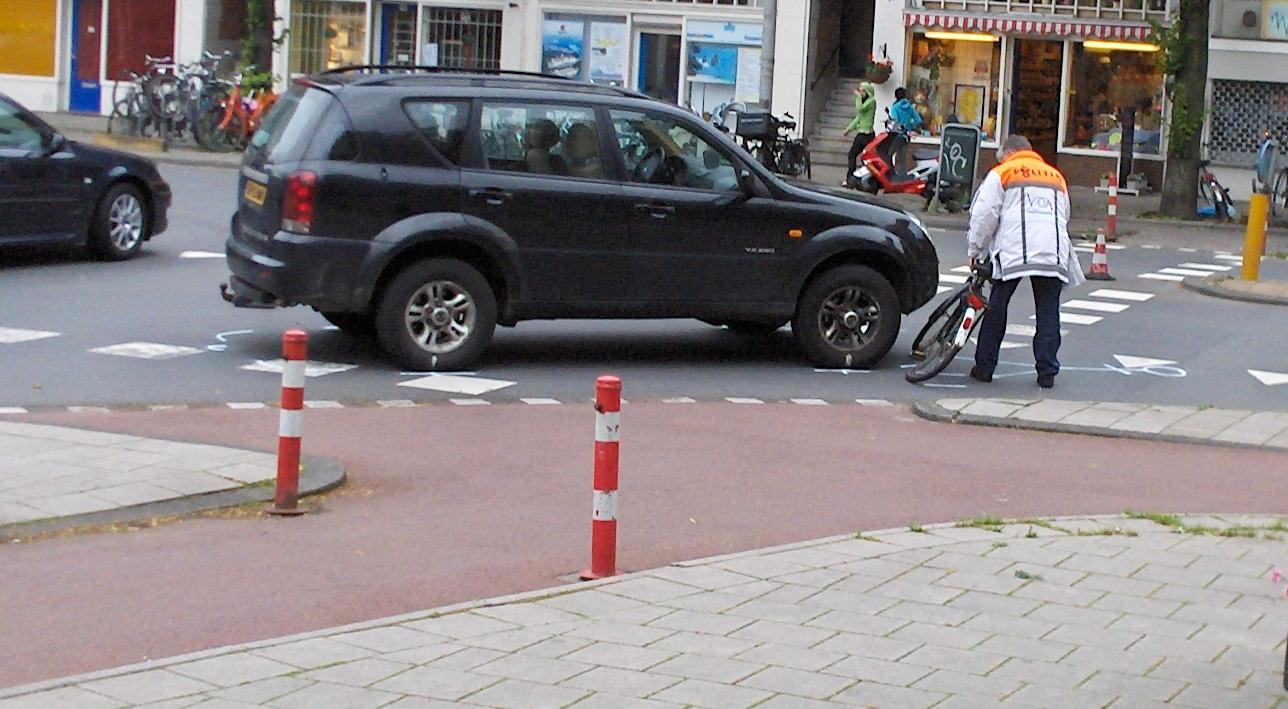
An accident caused in part by an A-pillar blind spot

This diagram shows the blocked view in a horizontal plane in front of the driver. The front-end blind spots caused by this can create problems in traffic situations, such as in roundabouts, intersections, and road crossings. Front-end blind spots are influenced by the following design criteria:

- Distance between the driver and the pillar
- Thickness of the pillar
- The angle of the pillar in a vertical plane side view
- The angle of the pillar in a vertical plane front view
- the form of the pillar is straight or arc-form
- Angle of the windshield
- Height of the driver about the dashboard
- Speed of the opposite car

The front left side A-pillar (not shown in the illustration) also causes blind spot issues when a car approaches a pedestrian crossing while a pedestrian is crossing the street left to right.

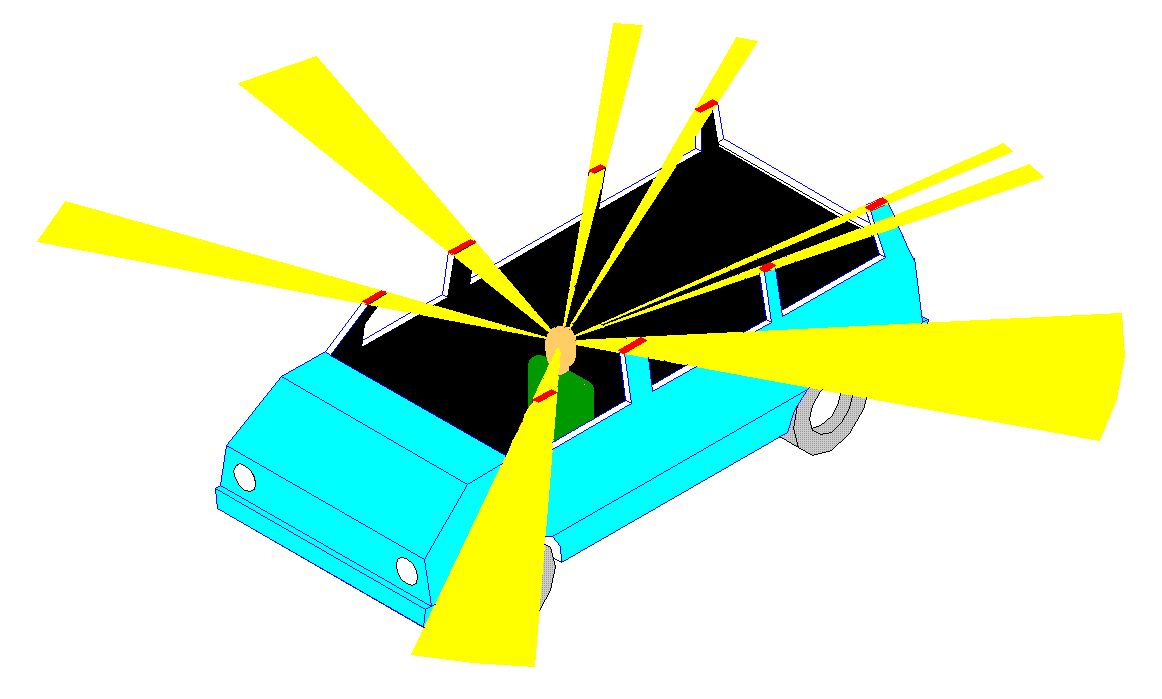
40° angle A-pillar bar blind spots

=== Types of A-pillar design ===
Most passenger cars have a diagonal pillar in the side view. The angle between the horizon and A-pillar is approximately 40 degrees with a straight pillar that is not too thick. This gives the car a strong, aerodynamic body with an adequately sized front door.

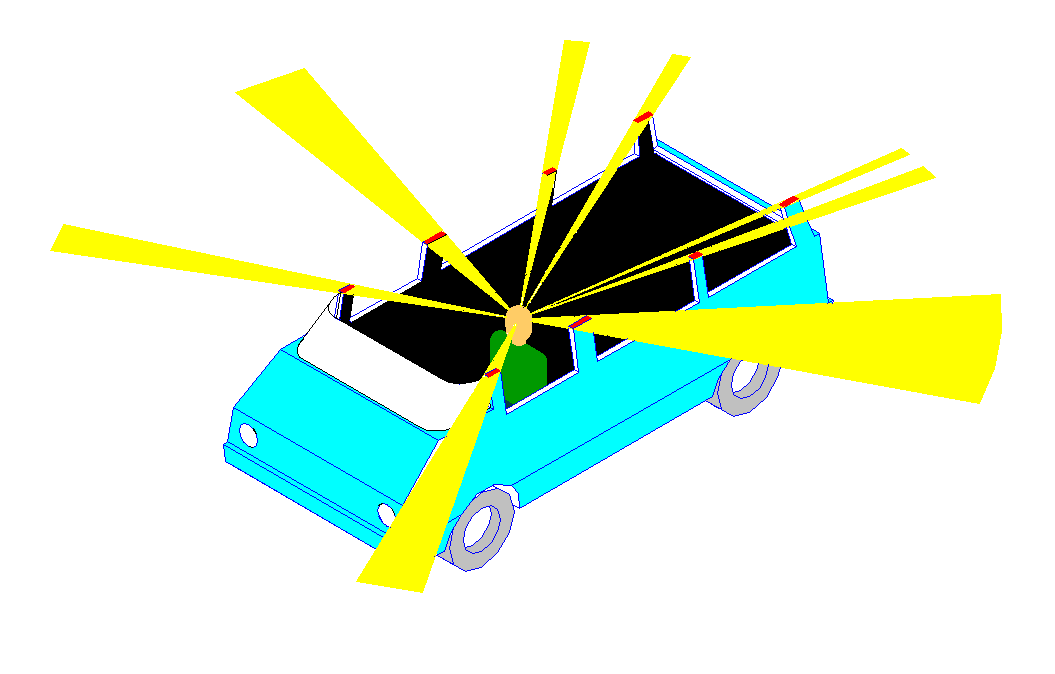
Vertical A-pillar having small blind spots

==== Panoramic vertical A-pillars ====
The sides of a panoramic windshield are curved, which makes it possible to design vertical A-pillars that give the driver maximum forward visibility. However, it is impossible to design an aerodynamic small car with a vertical A-pillar because the more vertical the A-pillar is, the less space the door opening has, and the greater frontal area and coefficient of drag the vehicle will have.

Examples of cars with an almost vertical A-pillar:

- Honda Step Bus Concept
- Saab 900
- School bus
- Almost all Cadillacs from 1954 to 1959

==== Flat A-pillar design ====
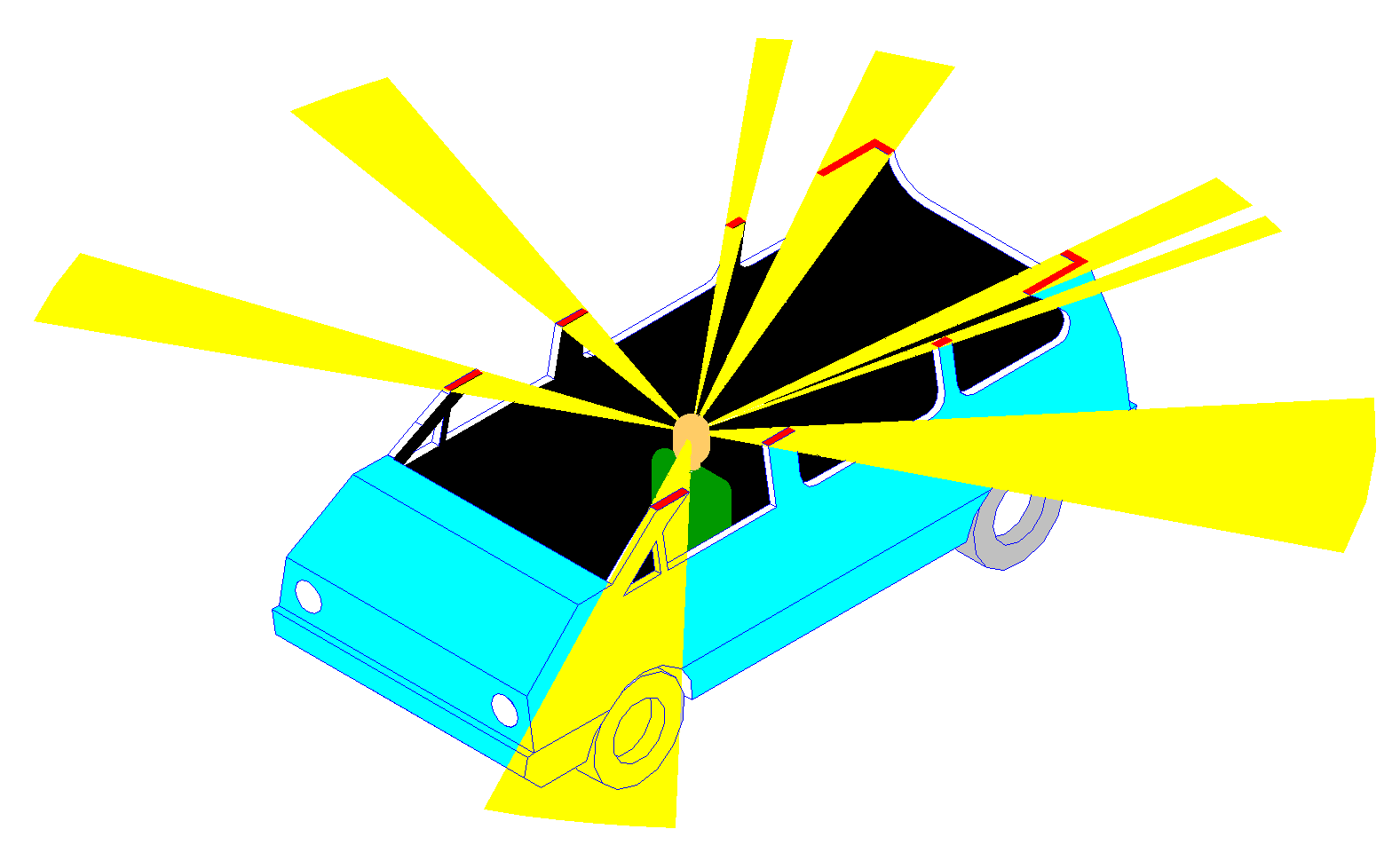
Flat A-pillar bars reduce driver visibility

Some modern car designs have an extremely flat A-pillar angle with the horizon. For example, the Pontiac Firebird and Chevrolet Camaro from 1993 to 2002 had a windshield angle of 68° with the vertical, which equals just 22° with the horizon.

A flatter A-pillar's advantages include reducing the overall drag coefficient and making the car body stronger in a frontal collision, at the expense of reducing driver visibility in a 180° field of view from left to right. A flatter A-pillar (and therefore windscreen) is also a factor when calculating the effects of a collision with a pedestrian. In general, a flatter angle will result in a more gentle impact, directing the pedestrian "up and over" rather than directly into the windscreen. This is particularly true for cars like the Mercedes-Benz A-Class which also have a low angled engine cover.

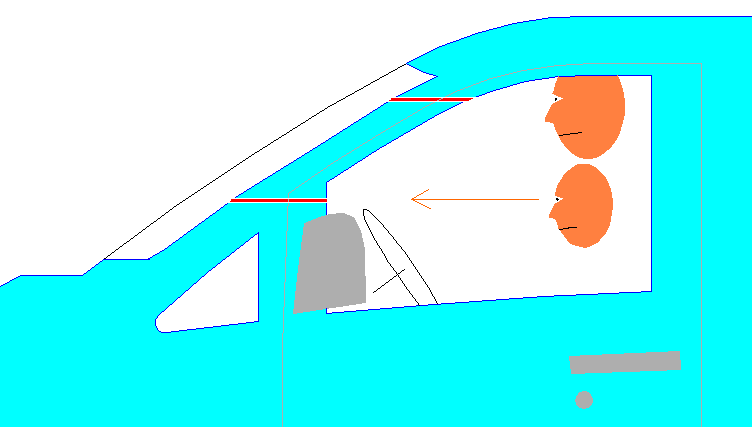
Car with a "quarter glass", visibility of short and tall drivers

===== Other disadvantages of a flat windshield angle =====
- Other traffic can not see the driver through the reflection if the driver can see them.
- The heater needs more time to heat the bigger window surface.
- The flat windshield angle does not let the snow slide off easily.
- The driver cannot reach the whole flat window to clean it easily.

=== Height of the driver ===
Driver height can also affect visibility.

An A-pillar that is split up and has a small triangle window (Front Quarter glass) can give short driver visibility problems. In some cars, the windshield is fillet with the roof-line with a big radius. A fillet round A-pillar can give a tall driver visibility problems. Also sometimes the A-pillar can block the driver from seeing motorcyclists.

Also, the B-pillar can block the vision of a tall driver in small 4-door cars.

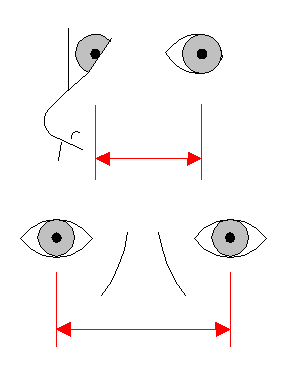
Turning your head reduces blind spot

A driver may reduce the size of a blind spot or eliminate it by turning their head in the direction of the obstruction. This allows the driver to see better around the obstruction and allows the driver better depth perception.

=== Visibility in a convertible ===
Because there is no roof connection between the A- and B-pillars, the A-pillars of a convertible automobile have to be stronger and even thicker.

However, with the top down there are no B or C pillars, improving visibility behind the driver.

=== Windshield reflections ===
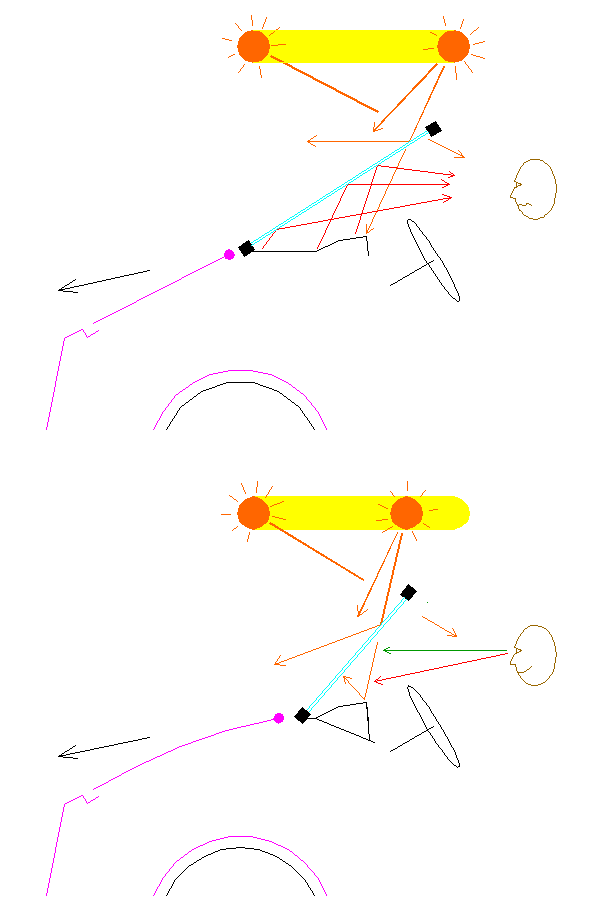
Sunlight dashboard reflection

==== Dashboard reflection ====
It is best if the dashboard has a non-reflecting dark-colored surface.

A small dashboard gives some reflection on the lower part of the windshield.

A big dashboard can give a reflection on eye height.

==== A-pillar reflection ====
It is best if the inside of the A-pillar has a non-reflecting dark-colored surface.

If the side of the window is curved there is less A-pillar reflection.

=== Light through roof reflection ===
Newer cars can have sunroofs. the possibility of sunlight shining through creating a reflection on the windshield could create a hazard.

=== Other automobile design factors ===
Renault Magnum with the set of mirrors for blind spots. Including downview mirror.

Other design factors may prevent a manufacturer from maximizing visibility. These include safety, as narrower pillars cannot be made strong as easily as thicker pillars, and size restraints about aerodynamics, as taller, more vertical windshields create additional drag and reduce fuel efficiency. They also include fashion and cost, whereby design and appearance considerations can be deemed preeminent.

Side radar systems offer better performance and also warn of fast-approaching vehicles entering the blind spot.

== Trams and trains ==
Generic warning sign used to warn about blind spots around trams and trains

Blind spots also exist around trams (streetcars/trolleys) and trains (locomotives with railway carriages and multiple units). Heavier rolling stocks can have up to several meters of blind spot. This is generally known as the dead visual range of a train. To address this, cameras are sometimes placed around the train driver's cab to cover the missing field of view during coupling/decoupling between locomotives and railcars, multiple units, special railway equipments or another locomotives.

== Agricultural equipment ==
Blind spots also exist around agricultural equipment (utility tractors, combine harvesters, etc.).

== Heavy equipment ==
Blind spots also exist around heavy equipment (excavators, bulldozers, wheel loaders, cranes, etc.).

== Boats and ships ==
A blind spot in a (large) vessel

A blind spot in a (large) motorboat

The French law requires signs on large vehicles such as trucks or coaches.

Blind spots also exist in front of boats and ships. When the boat accelerates, the bow rises, increasing the size of the blind spot. Large vessels can have up to several hundreds of meters of blind spots. This is generally known as the dead visual range of a ship. To address this, cameras are sometimes placed in the front of the vessel to cover the missing field of view.

Blind spots exist where areas behind the sail are obscured from the view of a helmsman on a sailboat or windsurfer. This is especially true when they are heeled over; consequently, transparent windows are sometimes sewn into the sails.

== Aircraft ==
Blind spots also exist around aircraft (helicopters, airships, airplanes, gliders). When the aircraft (airplane) accelerates for take off, the size of the blind spot below fuselage increases. Heavier aircraft can have up to several meters of blind spots. This is generally known as the dead visual range of an aircraft. To address this, cameras are sometimes placed in the front of the aircraft to cover the missing field of view.

== See also ==
- Advanced driver-assistance systems
- Automatic parking
- Backup collision
- Backup camera
- Blind spot monitor
- Car safety
- Concave mirror
- Convex mirror
- Dooring
- Dry steering
- Experimental Safety Vehicle (ESV)
- Fresnel lens
- Intelligent Parking Assist System
- Intelligent car
- Lane departure warning system
- Laser rangefinder
- Objects in mirror are closer than they appear
- Omniview technology
- Parking
- Parking sensors
- Pininfarina vertical A-pillar Ferrari P4/5
- Positive train control
- Precrash system
- Rear-view mirror
- Side-view mirror
- Sonar
- Train protection system
- Volvo SCC
- Wing mirror
- Work-related road safety in the United States for trucks and buses
