= Surround-view system =

Surround view, also called as around view or birds-eye view, is a type of parking assistance system that uses multiple cameras to help drivers monitor their surroundings. It was first introduced in 2007 as the "Around View Monitor" parking assistance option for the Nissan Elgrand and Infiniti EX.

== Principle ==
Early vehicle parking assistant products used ultrasonic parking sensors and/or a single rear-view camera to view and obtain distances to objects surrounding the vehicle, providing drivers with an audible alarm or rear-view video through a fisheye lens. There are some drawbacks to these early products: the alarm only provides a proximity warning but not the position of the object(s) relative to the vehicle, and the rear-view camera has a limited field of view. Multiple-camera systems overcome these problems and have seen increasing availability.

Omniview system

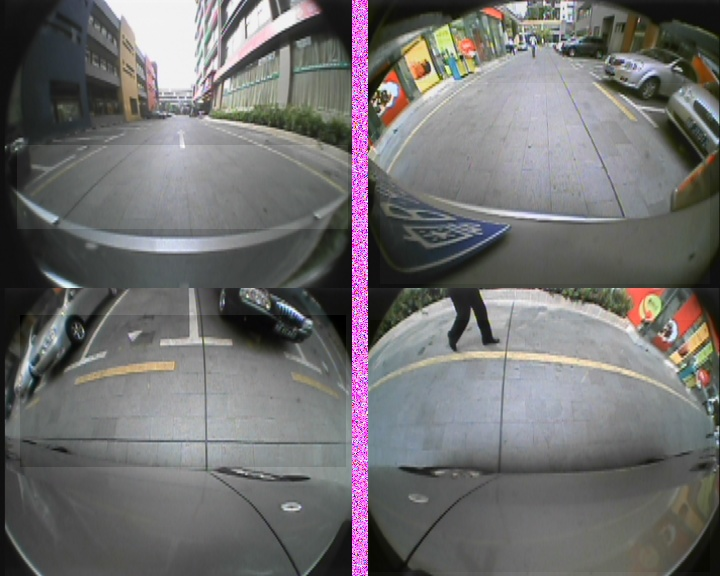
Input images; clockwise from upper left: views from the rear, forward, right, and left side cameras

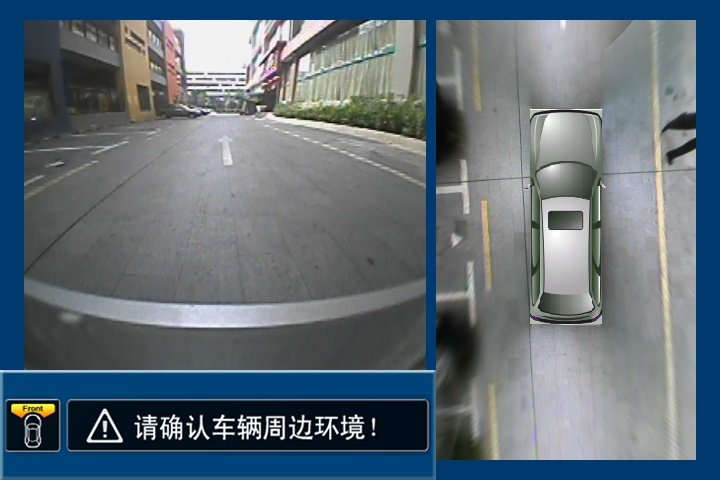
Common output interface; rear-view camera given prominence on the left, and omniview shown on the right with generic rendered vehicle

In most omniview systems, there are four wide-angle cameras: one in the front of the vehicle, one in the back of the vehicle, and one each in the side-mounted rear view mirrors. The four cameras have overlapping fields of view that collectively cover the whole area around the vehicle and serve as an omnidirectional (360-degree) camera. Video from the cameras are sent to the processor, which synthesizes a bird's-eye view from above the vehicle by stitching the video feeds together, correcting distortion, and transforming the perspective. In some cases, ultrasonic sensors are used in combination with the omniview system to provide distance information and highlight the relevant view that may be affected by potential obstacles.

Because the bird's-eye view is a simulated perspective using camera inputs much closer to the ground, objects at ground level will appear relatively undistorted while those above the ground will appear to "lean away" from the vehicle. In addition, if the same object is captured by the overlapping fields of two cameras, it can appear to lean away in two different directions.

== History ==
The first vehicle equipped with Nissan's "Around View Monitor" was the Japanese-market Elgrand, introduced in November 2007. In America, the system was introduced one month later, as an option for the EX35 from Nissan's luxury marque Infiniti. At about the same time, Mitsubishi Motors and Honda implemented similar functionality as the "Multi-around monitor system" for the Delica and "Multi-View Camera System" for the Odyssey, respectively.

Third-party automotive component suppliers such as Freescale Semiconductor and Continental AG have developed and marketed modular omniview systems, the latter through the acquisition of Application Solutions Ltd. (ASL Vision).

Nissan have since added moving object detection using the cameras, billing the system as "Intelligent Around View Monitor" (I-AVM). In 2016, stuntman Paul Swift used the I-AVM system to match the world record for the tightest J-turn in a specially-prepared Nissan Juke, using a space just 18 cm (7.1 in) wider than the vehicle's length to turn it around with the windows completely blacked out.

An omniview system that uses four cameras and displays a three-dimensional rendering of the vehicle and its surroundings has been proposed as a logical next step to increase the driver's awareness.

== See also ==
- Advanced driver-assistance systems
- Automatic parking
- Automotive safety
- Backup camera
- Blind spot monitor
- Dry steering
- Experimental Safety Vehicle (ESV)
- Intelligent Parking Assist System
- Intelligent car
- Lane departure warning system
- Laser rangefinder
- Precrash system
- Rear-view mirror
- Side-view mirror
- Sonar
- Wing mirror
