= Automatic parking =

Autonomous car-maneuvering system

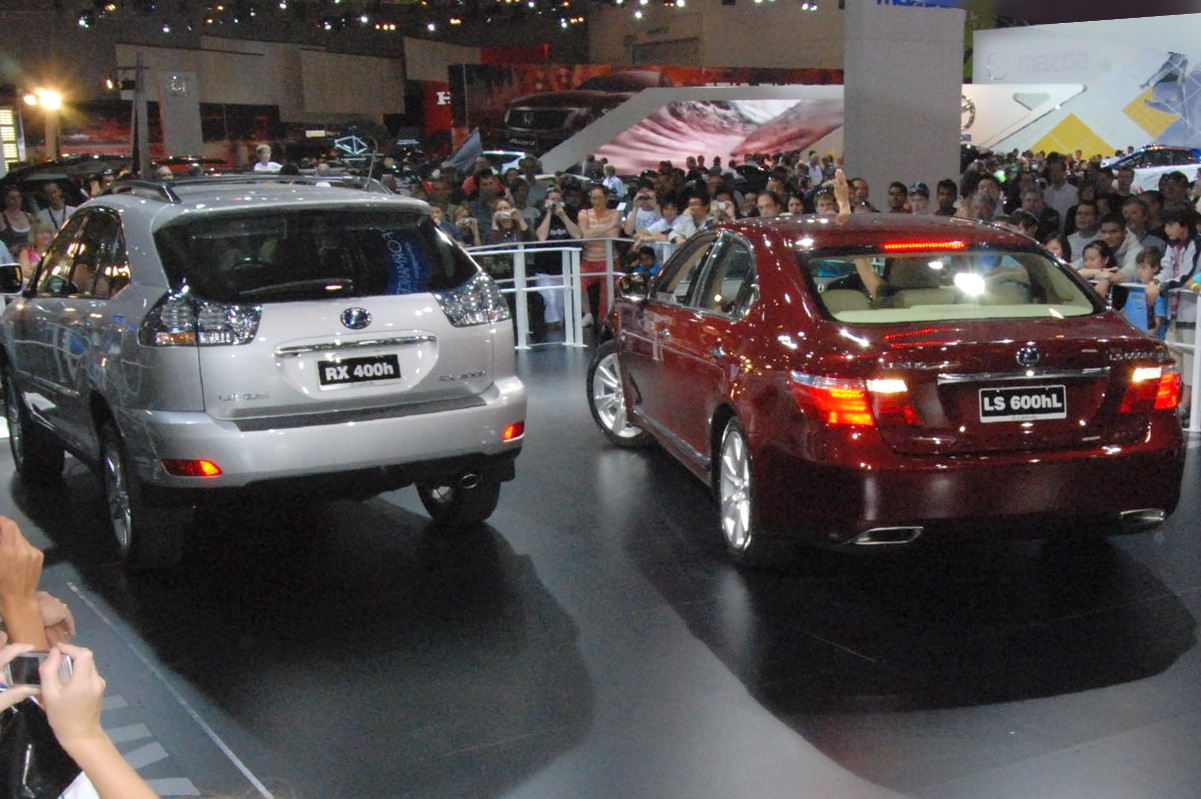
Demonstration of the automatic parking system on a Lexus LS

Automatic parking is an autonomous car-maneuvering system that moves a vehicle from a traffic lane into a parking spot to perform parallel, perpendicular, or angle parking. The automatic parking system aims to enhance the comfort and safety of driving in constrained environments where much attention and experience is required to steer the car. The parking maneuver is achieved by means of coordinated control of the steering angle and speed which takes into account the actual situation in the environment to ensure collision-free motion within the available space.

Multiple car manufacturers have added limited versions of an Automated Valet Parking (AVP) system to their vehicles. The systems allow a car to park itself in certain parking lots or garages, without a driver in the vehicle.

== Development ==
One of the first assistance systems for car parking was manual. It used four jacks with wheels to raise the car and then move it sideways into the available parking space. This mechanical system was proposed in 1934, but was never offered on any production model.

One of the world's first experimental prototypes of automatic parallel parking was developed on an electric car Ligier at INRIA in the mid-1990s. The underlying technology has been adopted by major automobile manufacturers offering an automatic parking option in their cars today.

The automatic parallel parking algorithm localizes a sufficient parking place along the roadside, attains a convenient start location for the car in front of the parking place, and performs a parallel parking maneuver. Automatic pulling out involves localizing an available space for the car motion within the parking place, placing the car at an appropriate spot at the rear of the parking place, and performing a maneuver to pull out of the parking place into the traffic lane.

The key concept behind automatic parking is to plan and parameterize the basic control profiles of steering angle and speed in order to achieve the desired shape of the vehicle's path within the available space. The parking maneuver is performed as a sequence of controlled motions using sensor data from the car servo systems and range measurements about the environment. The steering and velocity controls are computed in real time and executed. The approach results in various path shapes required to perform parking maneuvers.

The car is an example of a nonholonomic system where the number of control commands available is less than the number of coordinates that represent its position and orientation.

In 1992, Volkswagen proposed an automatic parking technology using four-wheel steering in its IRVW (Integrated Research Volkswagen) Futura concept car, allowing it to move sideward for parallel parking. However, no commercial version of this technology was ever offered. The idea of four-wheel steering has been revisited in an electric vehicle ROboMObil of the German Aerospace Center. The vehicle stops in front of an empty parking spot and re-orients its four wheels in the perpendicular direction (leaving rubber marks on the road) to prepare for subsequent sideward motion.

In 2004, a group of Linköping University students working with Volvo developed a project Evolve. The Evolve car can automatically perform parallel parking by using sensors and a computer to control steering, acceleration and braking of Volvo S60.

An automatic parking system uses various methods to detect objects around the vehicle. Sensors installed on the front and rear bumpers can act as both a transmitter and a receiver. These sensors emit a signal that will be reflected back when it encounters an obstacle near the vehicle. Then, the car will use the time of flight to determine the position of the obstacle. Other systems use cameras, e.g. omniview technology, or radars to detect obstacles and measure the parking space size and distance from the roadside.

An automatic parking system has been shown to improve comfort and safety by reducing the level of stress people feel when manual steering for parallel parking and garage parking maneuvers.

For articulated vehicle automatic parking systems, artificial intelligence (AI) techniques have been employed, such as adaptive neuro fuzzy inference systems (ANFIS) and fuzzy C-means (FCM). Unlike regular cars, these vehicles need advanced technology to control their movements and avoid problems like jackknifing, where the trailer swings out of control.

== Commercial systems ==
In 2003, Toyota began to sell their Japanese Prius hybrid vehicle with an automatic parallel parking capability offered as an option named Intelligent Parking Assist. In 2006, Lexus added a self-parking system to the redesigned Lexus LS sedan; it parallel parks as well as angle parks. In 2009, Ford introduced their Active Park Assist beginning with their Lincoln models; it does parallel parking. In 2010, BMW introduced a system called "parking assistant" on the redesigned 5 Series to perform parallel parking.

Up to 2012, automatic parking systems were being developed by several automobile manufacturers. Ford and Lincoln offered active park assist on Ford Focus, Fusion, Escape, Explorer, and Flex and Lincoln MKS and MKT. Toyota and Lexus had advanced parking assistant on Toyota Prius V Five and Lexus LS460 and LS460 L. BMW all-new sixth-generation 3 Series used a system called parking assistant. Audi had a parking assistance system on the Audi A6. Mercedes-Benz also offered parktronic on their C-Class, CLS-Class Coupe, M-Class SUV, E-Class, S-Class, GL350, GL450 SUV (standard on the GL550), and R-Class in different prices.

The Holden Commodore (VF), released in 2013, featured automatic parallel and 90-degree parking as standard across the entire range.

Jeep introduced an automatic parallel and perpendicular parking system, called ParkSense, on its 2014 Cherokee model. Chrysler introduced an all-new 2015 200 sedan, offering ParkSense as part of a safety package.

In 2014, BMW demonstrated an i3 equipped with a parking assistant system activated from a smartwatch.

== Automated valet parking ==
In 2015, Bosch announced plans to release a fully automated valet parking system. This driverless system allows the driver to get out of the car and activate an autonomous parking from a smartphone. The system will calculate a parking maneuver and monitor the surroundings.

Multiple car manufacturers have since added limited versions of an automated valet parking (AVP) system to their vehicles. In 2019, Tesla added a "Smart Summon" ability as part of its Tesla Autopilot vehicle automation features. In 2020, Mercedes-Benz introduced a system named Intelligent Park Pilot for its S-Class. The system was co-developed with Bosch and tested in Stuttgart Airport. It was also later showcased in the EQS in Los Angeles. Audi announced in 2021 that it is also working on automated valet parking. In February 2023, BMW announced that it was partnering with Valeo to develop an automated parking system.

== Ethical considerations ==
Through the increased of use of these systems, ethical questions regarding safety, accessibility, and user privacy are raised.

The shift from manual parking technology to reliance on automatic computer systems draws concerns to liability issues these companies may face. Highlighting the ethical and legal challenges surrounding autonomous systems, some argue for a shared liability model between users and developers to incentivize safety improvements while protecting consumers from undue burden.

== See also ==
- Advanced driver-assistance systems
- Autonomous car (self-driving)
- Backup collision
- Backup camera
- Blind spot monitor
- Blind spot (vehicle)
- Car safety
- Dry steering
- Intelligent Parking Assist System
- Intelligent car
- Parking sensors
- Rear-view mirror
- Side-view mirror
- Sonar
