= Blind spot monitor =

Vehicle-based sensor device

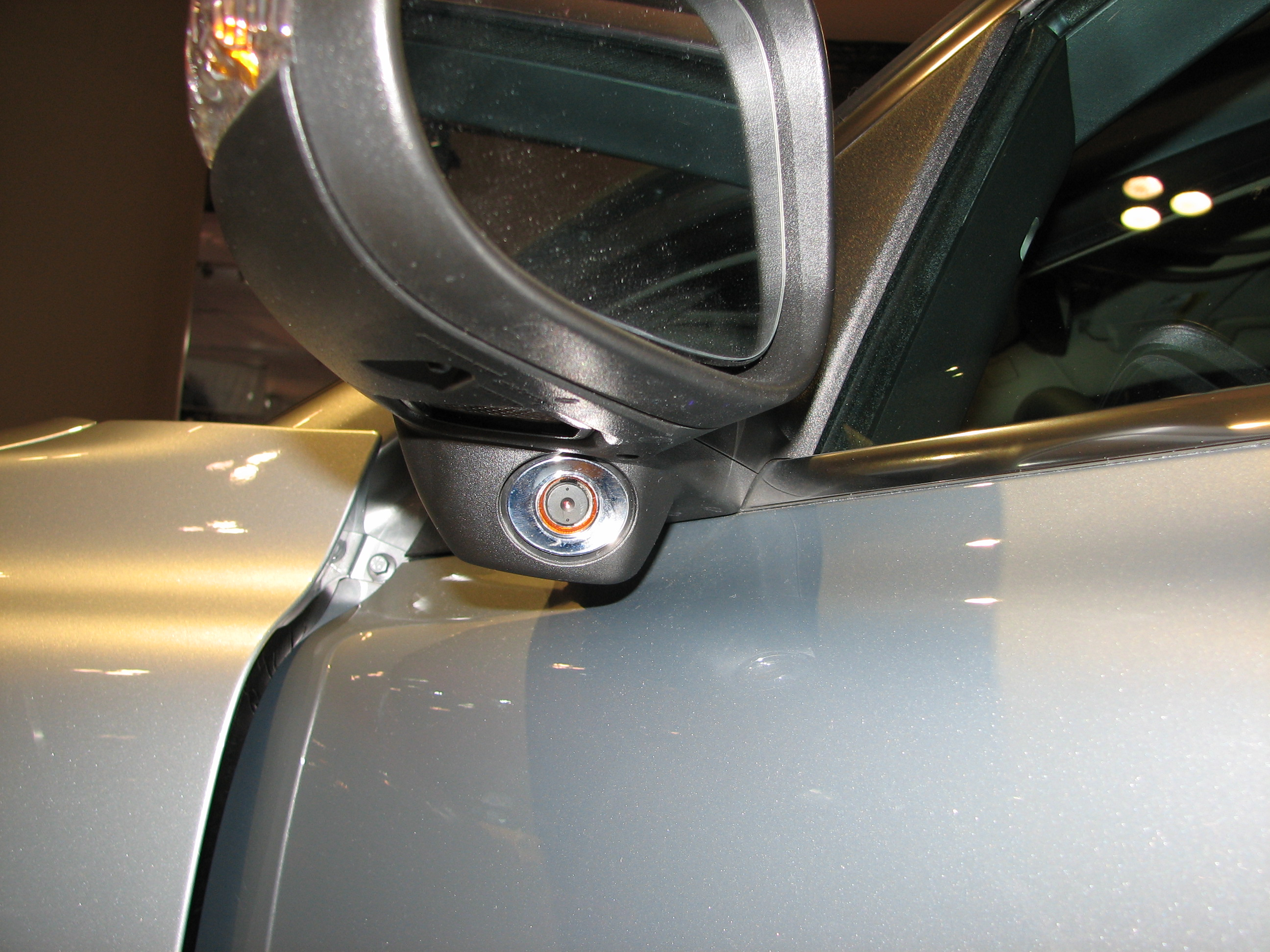
Optical blind spot detector on side mirrors

The vehicle blind spot monitor or simply blind-spot monitoring is a vehicle-based sensor device that detects other vehicles located to the driver's side and rear. Warnings can be visual, audible, vibrating, or tactile.

Vehicle blind spot (VBS) monitors may do more than monitor the sides and rear of the vehicle. They may also include "Rear Cross-Traffic Alert", "which alerts drivers backing out of a parking space when traffic is approaching from the sides."

== History ==
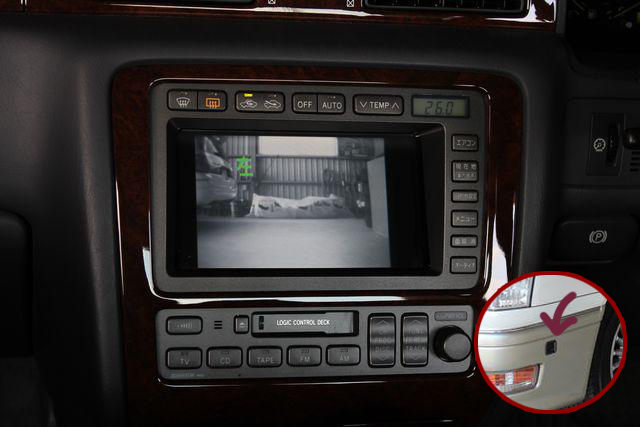
Blind corner monitor camera on Toyota Crown S150 (1995–1999)

If side view mirrors on a car are adjusted properly, there is no blind spot on the sides. This method was first documented by George Platzer in a 1995 paper presented to the Society of Automotive Engineers, but the method is frequently overlooked in driver's education classes and takes some getting used to. Untrained drivers tend to adjust the side mirrors too far in, so they can see the sides of their own vehicle, but cannot see vehicles traveling alongside in adjacent lanes. Calculated elimination of blind spots by trained drivers is inexpensive and obviates the need for expensive technological solutions to that problem, provided drivers take the time to set up and use their mirrors properly.

Platzer received a patent for his blind spot monitor, and it has been incorporated into various products associated with Ford Motor Company. The blind zone mirror has been touted as "an elegant and relatively inexpensive solution" to this recognized problem.

== Examples ==
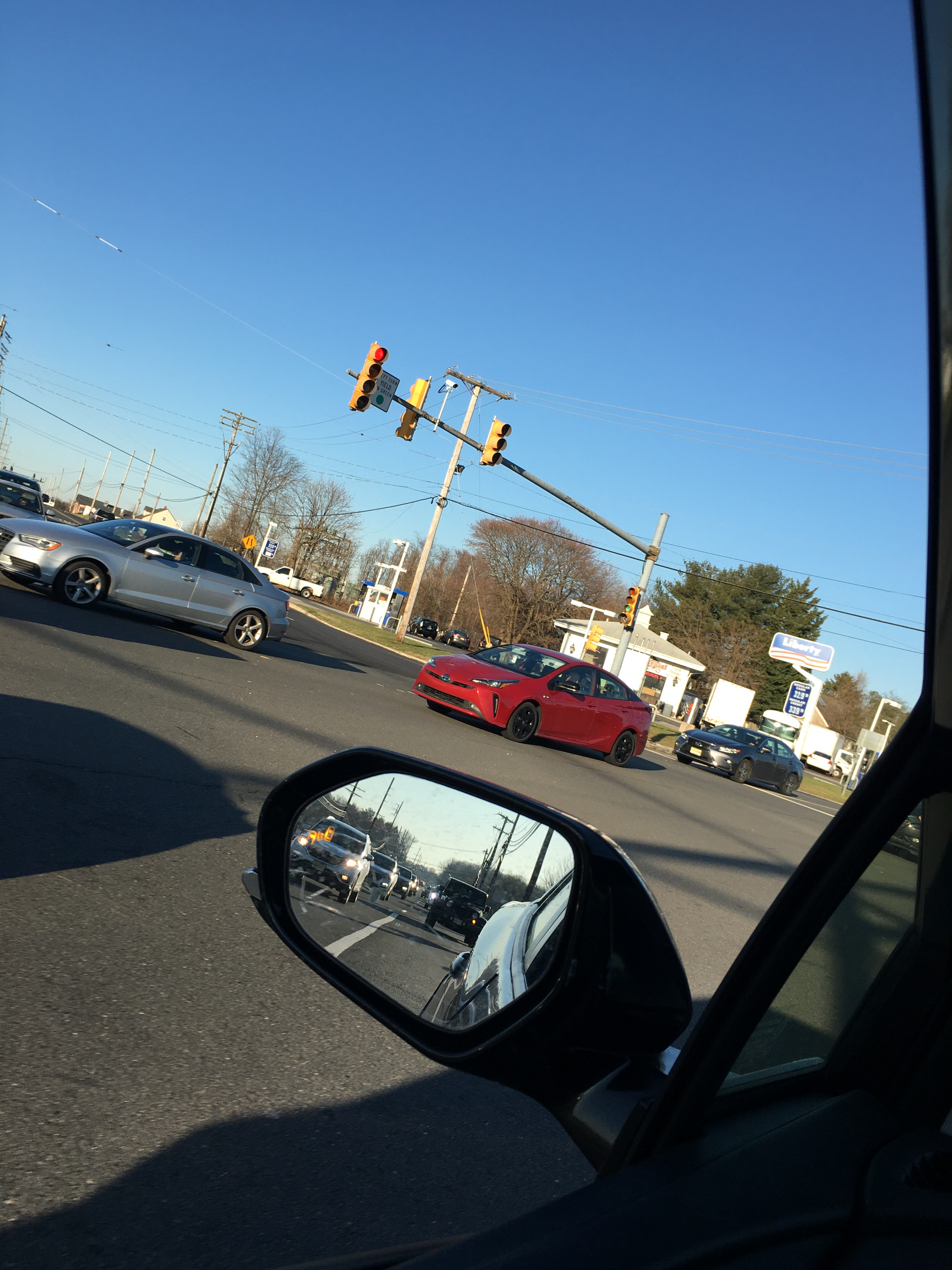
Blind spot monitor giving yellow warning in mirror

=== Volvo ===
BLIS is an acronym for Blind Spot Information System, a system of protection developed by Volvo. Volvo's previous parent, Ford Motor Company, has since adapted the system to its Ford, Lincoln, and Mercury brands.

This system was first introduced on the 2001 Volvo SCC concept car, then placed into production on the 2003 Volvo XC90 SUV and produced a visible alert when a car entered the blind spot while a driver was switching lanes, using cameras and radar sensors mounted on the door mirror housings to check the blind spot area for an impending collision. Volvo won an AutoCar Safety and Technology award for the introduction of this feature.

=== Mazda ===
Mazda was the first Japanese automaker to offer a blind spot monitor, which they refer to as "BSM" (Blind Spot Monitoring). It was initially introduced on the 2008 Mazda CX-9 Grand Touring and remained limited to only that highest trim level through the 2012 model year. For 2013, BSM was standard on both the CX-9 Touring and Grand Touring models.

Mazda also added BSM to the redesigned 2009 Mazda 6. Blind spot monitoring was standard equipment on the 6i and 6s Grand Touring trim levels, and was an available option on some lower trim levels. Mazda has since expanded the availability of BSM, having added it to the feature list of the Mazda2, Mazda3, CX-3, CX-5, MX-5 Miata, and the upcoming CX-30, often as part of an option package.

=== Ford ===
While only a concept car, the Ford GT90 was the first vehicle to be fitted with a modern blind spot monitoring system.

Currently, Ford uses the acronym BLIS for its blind spot detection. The system is active both in "drive" and "neutral" transmission gears, and is turned off when in reverse or park gears. On Ford products, the system was first introduced in the spring of 2009, on the 2010 Ford Fusion and Fusion Hybrid, 2010 Mercury Milan and Milan Hybrid, and 2010 Lincoln MKZ.

=== Mitsubishi ===
Mitsubishi offers a Blind Spot Warning (BSW) on the Pajero Sport, launched in 2016.

== Blind spot intervention ==
In 2010, the Nissan Fuga/Infiniti M for the first time offered countersteering capabilities to keep the vehicle from colliding.

== See also ==
- Advanced driver-assistance systems
- Automatic parking
- Automotive safety
- Backup collision
- Backup camera
- Collision avoidance system
- Dry steering
- Experimental Safety Vehicle (ESV)
- Intelligent Parking Assist System
- Intelligent car
- Lane departure warning system
- Laser rangefinder
- Objects in mirror are closer than they appear
- Omniview technology
- Overtaking
- Parking
- Parking sensors
- Precrash system
- Rear-view mirror
- Sonar
- Vehicular automation
- Wing mirror
