= Parallel parking =

Method of vehicle parking

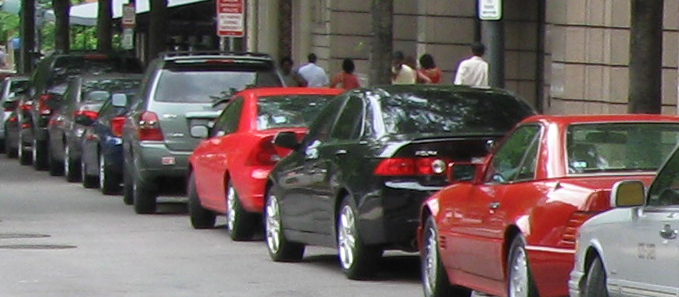
Parallel-parked cars in Washington, D.C.

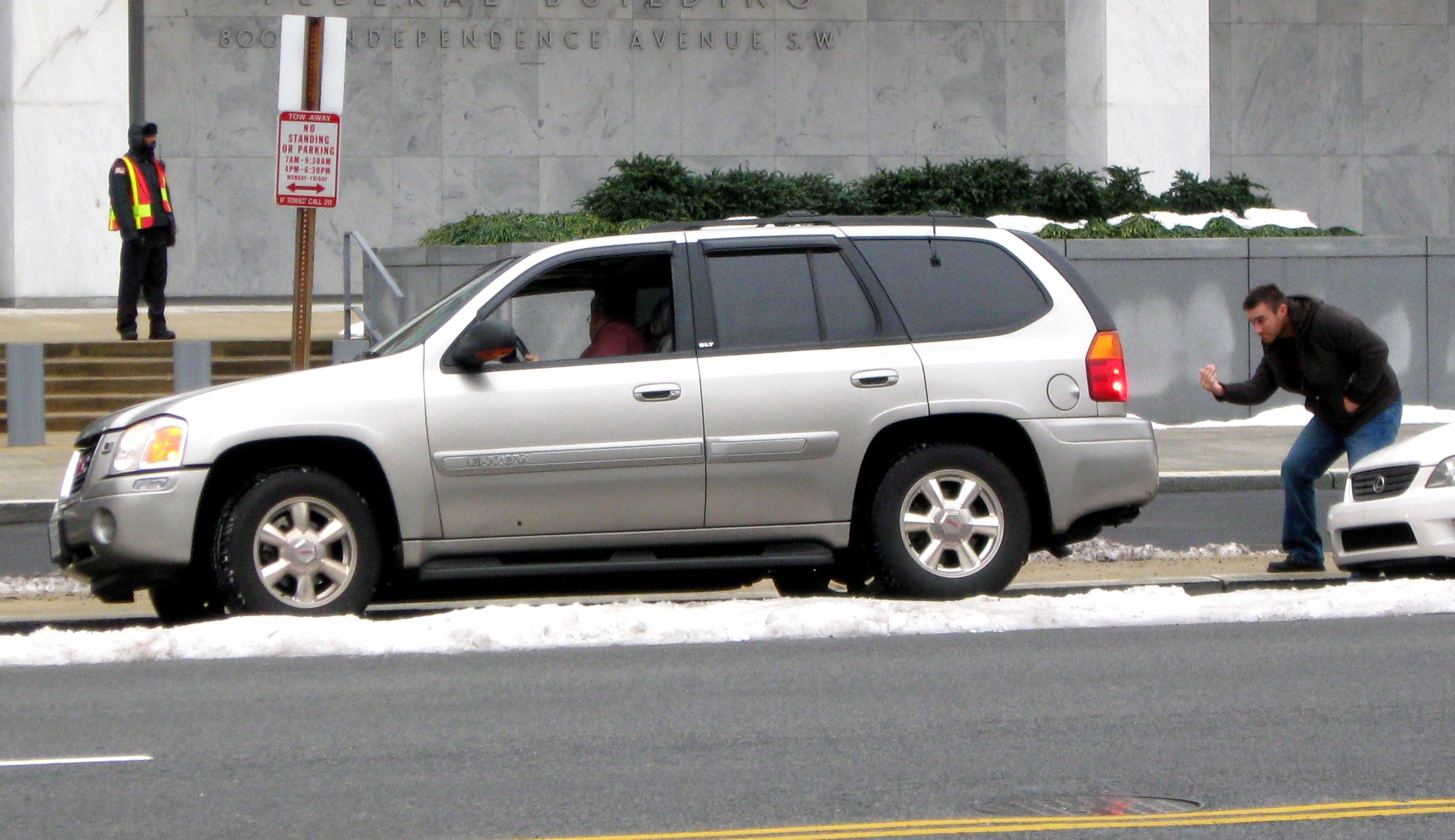
A motorist gets assistance parallel-parking

Parallel parking animation

Reverse parallel parking demonstration

Parallel parking is a method of parking a vehicle parallel to the road, in line with other parked vehicles. Parallel parking usually requires initially driving slightly past the parking space, parallel to the parked vehicle in front of that space, keeping a safe distance, then followed by reversing into that space. Subsequent position adjustment may require the use of forward and reverse gears.

== Techniques ==
Parallel parking is considered to be one of the most stressful and difficult skills for new drivers to learn. While parallel parking is a required part of most driving tests, several states in the US have dropped it as a requirement.

Parallel parking enables the driver to park a vehicle in a smaller space than would be true of forward parking. Driving forward into a parking space on the side of a road is typically not possible unless two or more successive parking spaces are empty. Reversing into the spot via the parallel parking technique allows one to take advantage of a single empty space not much longer than the car (in order to complete the parking within three wheel-turns the parking space would generally need to be about one and a half car-length long).

New drivers learn to use reference points to align themselves in relation to the car in front of the space, to determine the proper angle for backing, and to determine when to turn the steering wheel while backing. They may find it easier to briefly stop at each reference point and turn for the next step.

== Steps ==
Two major types of parallel parking technique differ in whether they will use two or three positions of the steering wheel while backing. A skilled driver is theoretically able to parallel park by having their car move along two arcs, the first having its center on the parking side of the car and the second having its center on the other side. There will be a point in the transition between these curves where all the car's wheels will be parallel with each other. Less-confident drivers may choose to drive further while transitioning, making it a pronounced middle step of three. Such a step allows greater tolerances to avoid hitting anything, but forces the car to start further from the road's edge and requires more space to the rear.

== Computer assisted parallel parking ==
Beginning in the early 2000s, automobile manufacturers began providing computer assisted automatic parking software on some models that allowed drivers to engage the software to complete the parallel parking maneuver hands-free. Depending on the system, the automatic parking feature controls the steering while the driver operates the accelerator and brakes, or the software handles both steering and accelerator.

== Legality ==
In Japan, there is a ban on on-street parking, with a few exceptions (such as daytime and evening parking). In addition to this, there is a proof-of-parking rule and motorists are required to present a garage certificate ("Shako shomei sho") to prove that they have a garage before being allowed to register a car.

== History ==
In the 1930s cars were developed with a fifth wheel, in between the two rear wheels and perpendicular to them, which could be lowered to the ground and used to drive sideways into a parallel parking spot. This innovation was intended to make parallel parking much easier, but it never became popular.

== See also ==
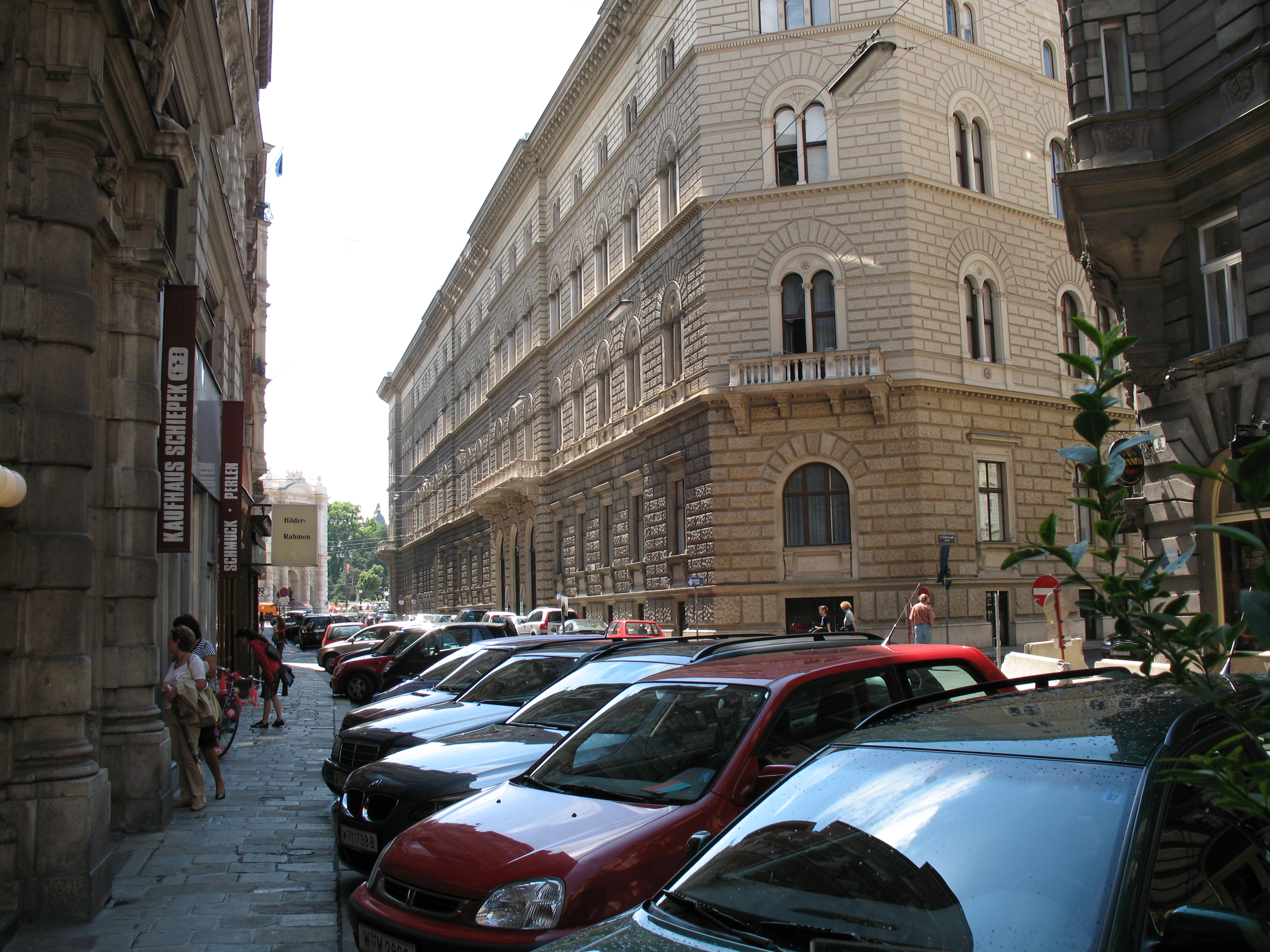
Angle parking

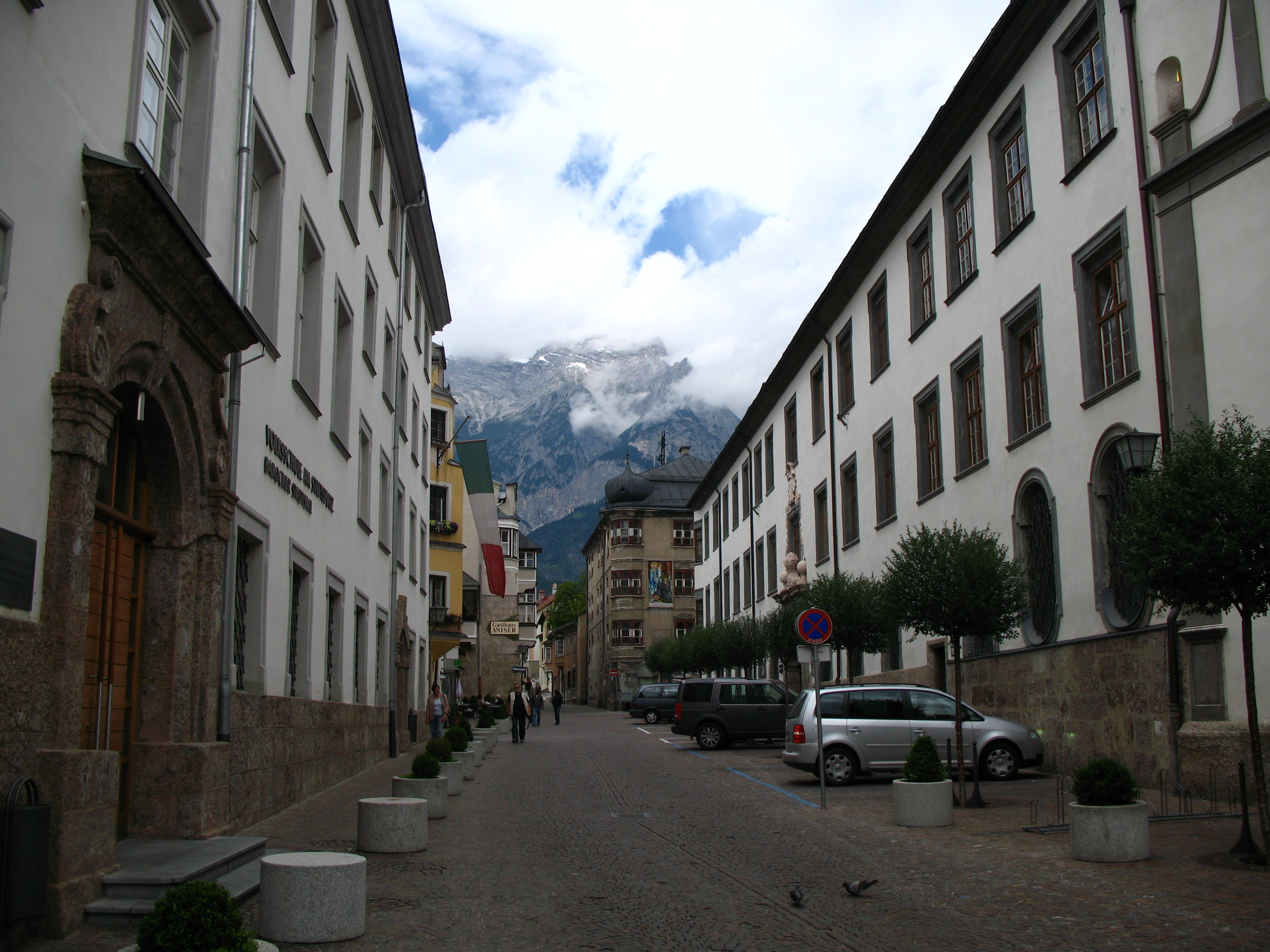
Perpendicular parking

- Advanced Parking Guidance System
- Automatic parking
- Door zone
- Parallel parking problem: the mathematics of parallel parking
- Removal of curbside parking spaces: frees up space for bicycle lanes
- Perpendicular parking or bay parking
