= Side-view mirror =

Vehicle wing mirror

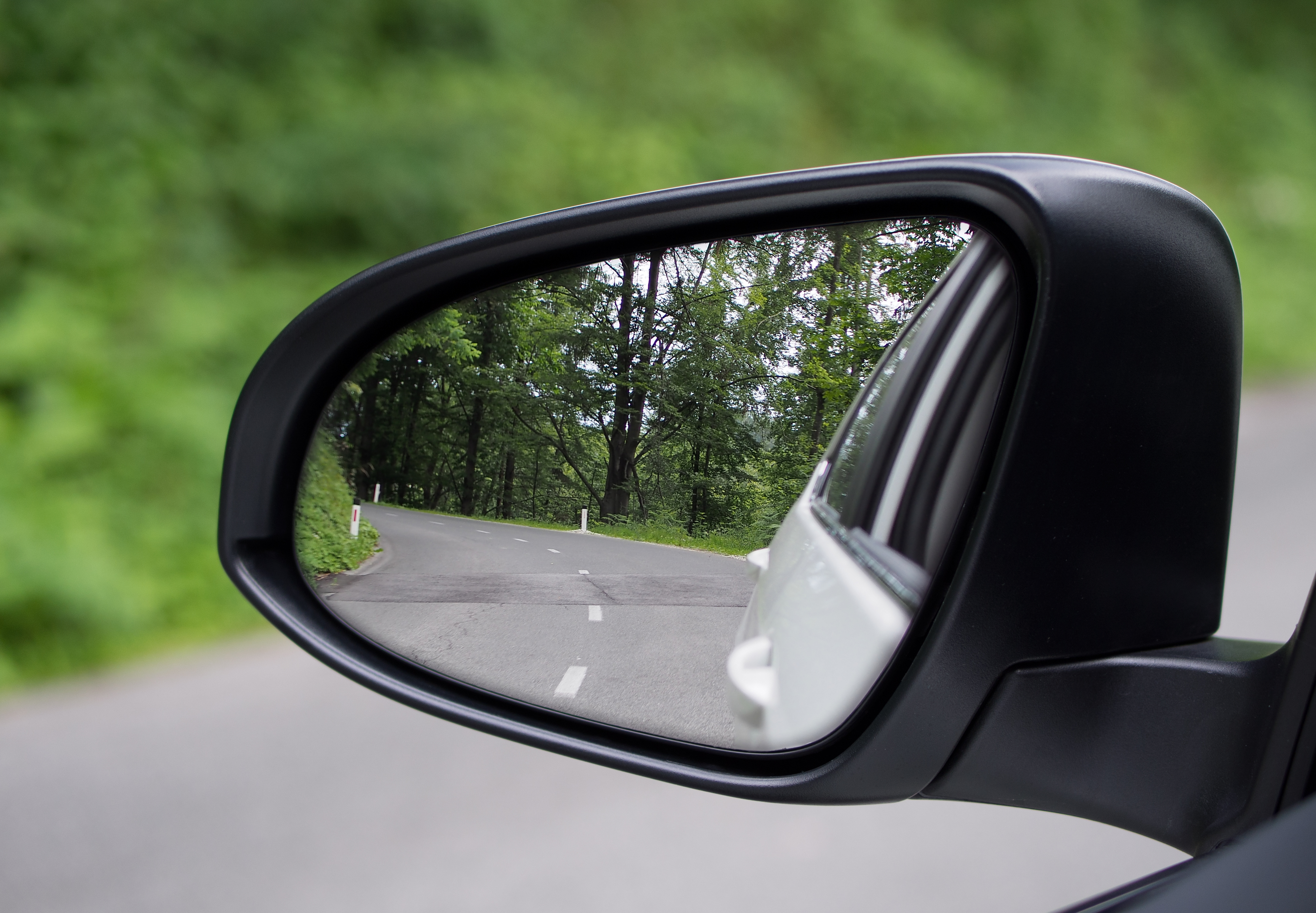
Dual-contour side mirror. Large inboard convex surface is separated from small outboard aspheric surface

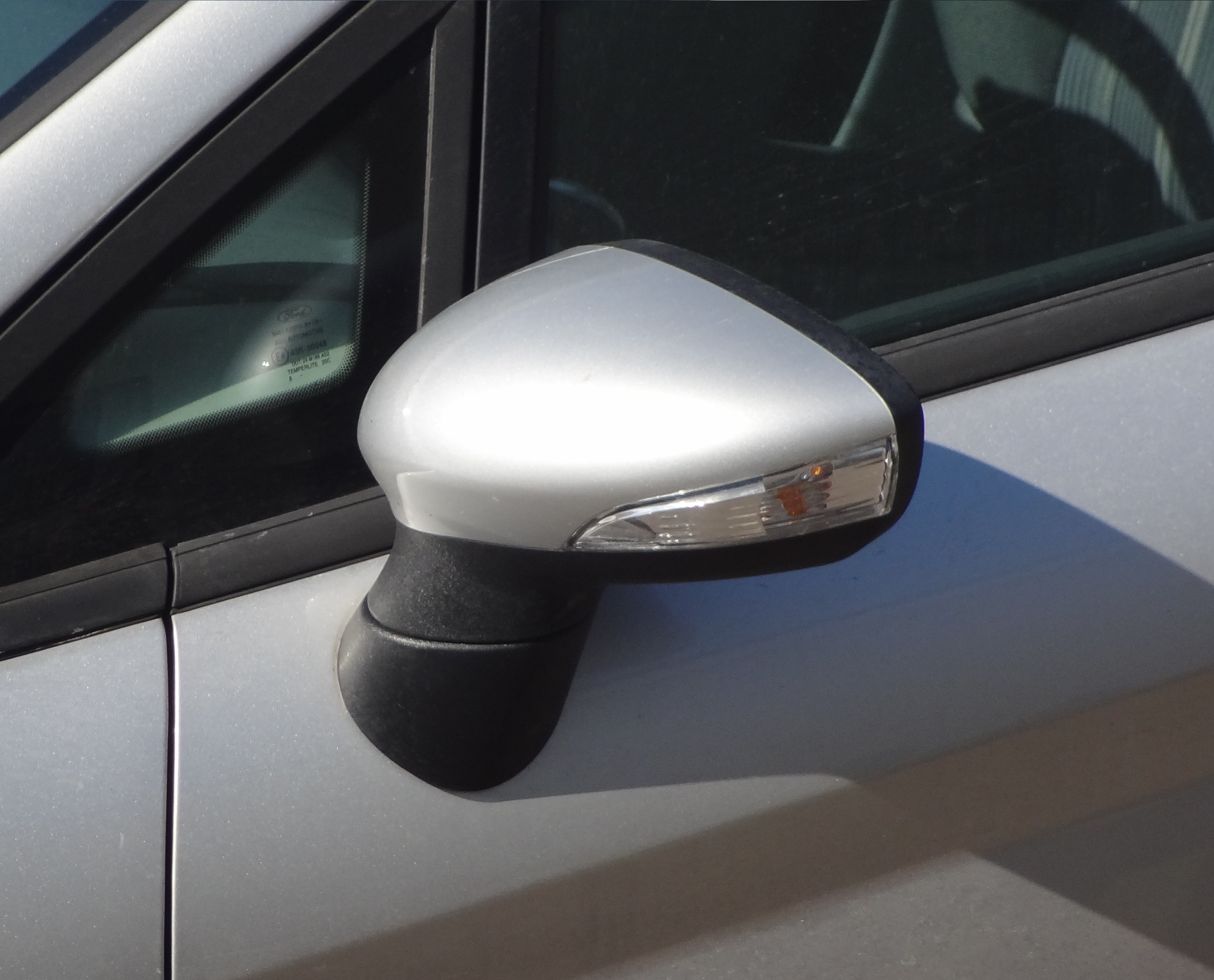
Ford Fiesta side mirror with integrated turn signal repeater

A side-view mirror (or side mirror), also known as a door mirror and often (in British English) called a wing mirror, is a mirror placed on the exterior of motor vehicles for the purposes of helping the driver see areas behind and to the sides of the vehicle, outside the driver's peripheral vision (in the "blind spot").

Almost all modern cars mount their side mirrors on the doors—normally at the A-pillar—rather than on the wings (fenders), the portion of the body above the wheel well, as was common on earlier cars.

The side mirror is equipped for manual or remote vertical and horizontal adjustment so as to provide adequate coverage to drivers of differing height and seated position. Remote adjustment may be mechanical by means of bowden cables, or may be electric by means of geared motors. The mirror glass may also be electrically heated and may include electrochromic dimming to reduce glare to the driver from the headlamps of following vehicles. Increasingly, the side mirror incorporates the vehicle's turn signal repeaters. There is evidence to suggest that mirror-mounted repeaters may be more effective than repeaters mounted in the previously predominant wing side location.

== Optional side mirror ==
Through the 1940s, most roads had just two lanes, one in each direction. Drivers usually had to be aware only of traffic ahead of and directly behind them. Due to this, early cars had just a single rear-view mirror mounted on the top of the windshield or on top of the dashboard. When side mirrors were introduced to help drivers see overtaking vehicles, most cars had only the driver-side mirror as standard equipment. A passenger-side mirror was optional on most cars through the 1970s. Today all 3 mirrors are standard on almost all passenger vehicles.

== Planar, convex, aspheric ==
In the U.S. and Canada, the U.S. National Highway Traffic Safety Administration's Federal Motor Vehicle Safety Standard 111 and the Canada Motor Vehicle Safety Standard 111 require the driver-side mirror to provide "unit magnification", i.e., an undistorted 1:1 reflection achieved with a flat mirror. However, unit magnification limits the field of view that can be provided by a mirror of size compatible with the vehicle body. The ECE regulations in use throughout most of the world except North America permit the driver-side mirror to have a planar, convex, or aspheric surface; an aspheric section is often combined with a larger convex section, and the two sections are separated by a visible line to alert the driver to the two sections' different perspective shifts.

Side mirror with warning legend: "Objects in the mirror are closer than they appear"

Because of the distance from the driver's eye to the passenger-side mirror, a useful field of view can be achieved only with a convex or aspheric mirror. However, the convexity also minifies the objects shown. Since such objects seem farther away than they actually are, a driver might make a maneuver such as a lane change assuming an adjacent vehicle is a safe distance behind, when in fact it is quite a bit closer. In the United States, Canada, India, Korea and Australia, non-planar mirrors are etched or printed with the warning legend objects in the mirror are closer than they appear. In Canada, this warning is often supplemented by a transparent decal on the passenger side window repeating the warning in French: les objets dans le retroviseur sont plus proche qu'ils ne le paraissent. In Korea, the warning appears in Korean. Warnings of this nature are not required in Europe.

=== Other requirements ===
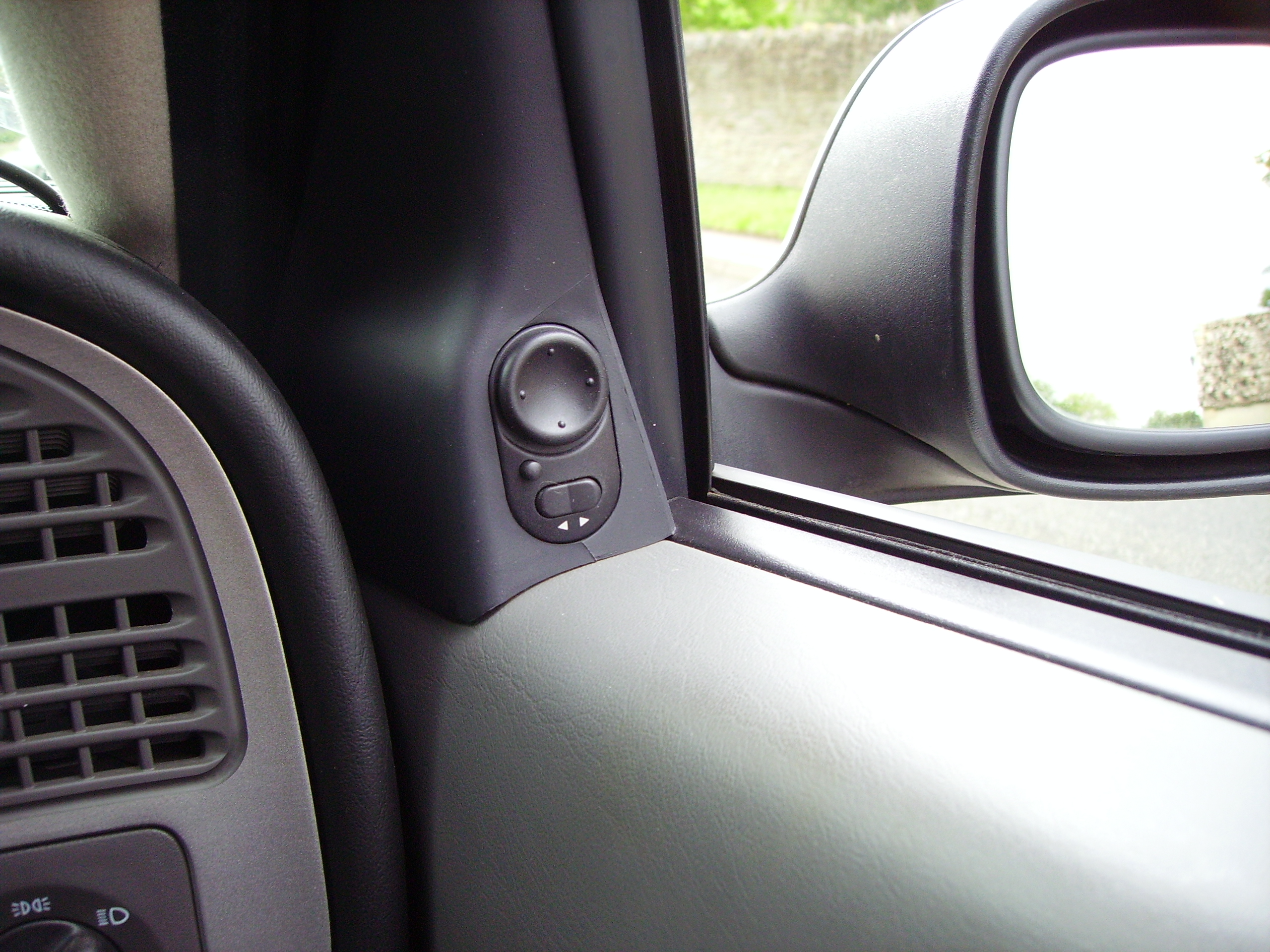
Driver's control for side mirrors, with tiny curb-view button

More commonly in cars manufactured since the 2000s, side mirrors may be manually or electrically folded in, to protect them when the car is parked or being washed in an automated car wash. Passing cars can easily clip protruding side mirrors; the folding capability helps protect them from harm. ECE Regulation 46 requires that side mirrors be mounted such that they swing away when struck by a test cylinder meant to represent a pedestrian.

Until March 1983, the Japanese Ministry of Transport did not allow cars to be registered without mirrors on front fenders (wings), so the mirrors were mounted far forward atop the front fenders. More recent Japanese-specification vehicles have side mirrors similar to those in other countries. Taxi drivers and other professional drivers retain a preference for the wing-mounted mirrors as they feel that they work better in extremely tight traffic.

U.S. Federal Motor Vehicle Safety Standard 111 requires that convex side-view mirrors must have a curvature radius of between 889 mm and 1651 mm. Canada Motor Vehicle Safety Standard 111 stipulates a range of between 890 mm and 1800 mm. Neither the U.S. nor the Canadian standard allows for aspheric mirrors. The European ECE Regulation 46 used throughout most of the world permits planar, convex, and/or aspheric mirrors on either side of the vehicle. American research suggests non-planar driver-side mirrors may help reduce crashes.

== Digital ==
In 2018, side mirrors in a form of camera and display were introduced for a better peripheral recognition upon driving. It has advantages over conventional ones as it may provide wider angle of sight and less air resistance without obstructing the driver's frontal view, though the first of these problems can be alleviated in regular mirrors by adjusting them such that the view presented offers only minimal overlap with that of the interior mirror.

Problems with digital mirrors include difficulties relating to the inherent lack of binocular vision (such as impaired depth perception, and the requirement for the viewer to readjust focus to the distance of the mirror surface instead of merely the distance to the object), as well as from problems related to both the reduced dynamic range and the sensitivity of a camera in low-light conditions. This type of mirror also needs power to function. These side mirrors are installed on various types of vehicles such as the Hyundai Ioniq 5 and Audi e-tron. Mercedes-Benz introduced such a system in 2018 in the Actros under the name "MirrorCam".

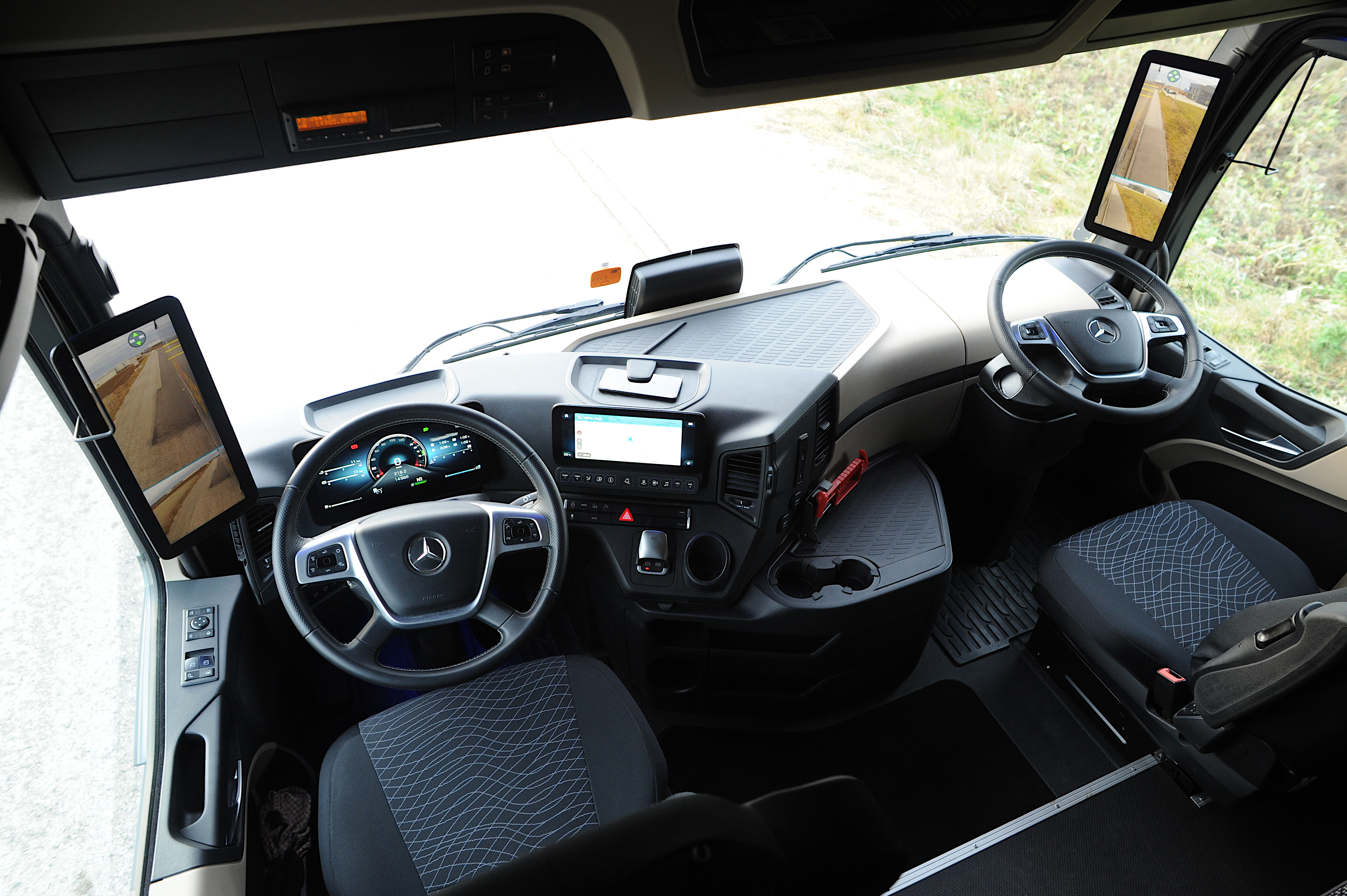
Mercedes-Benz Actros 5 cabin with digital mirrors

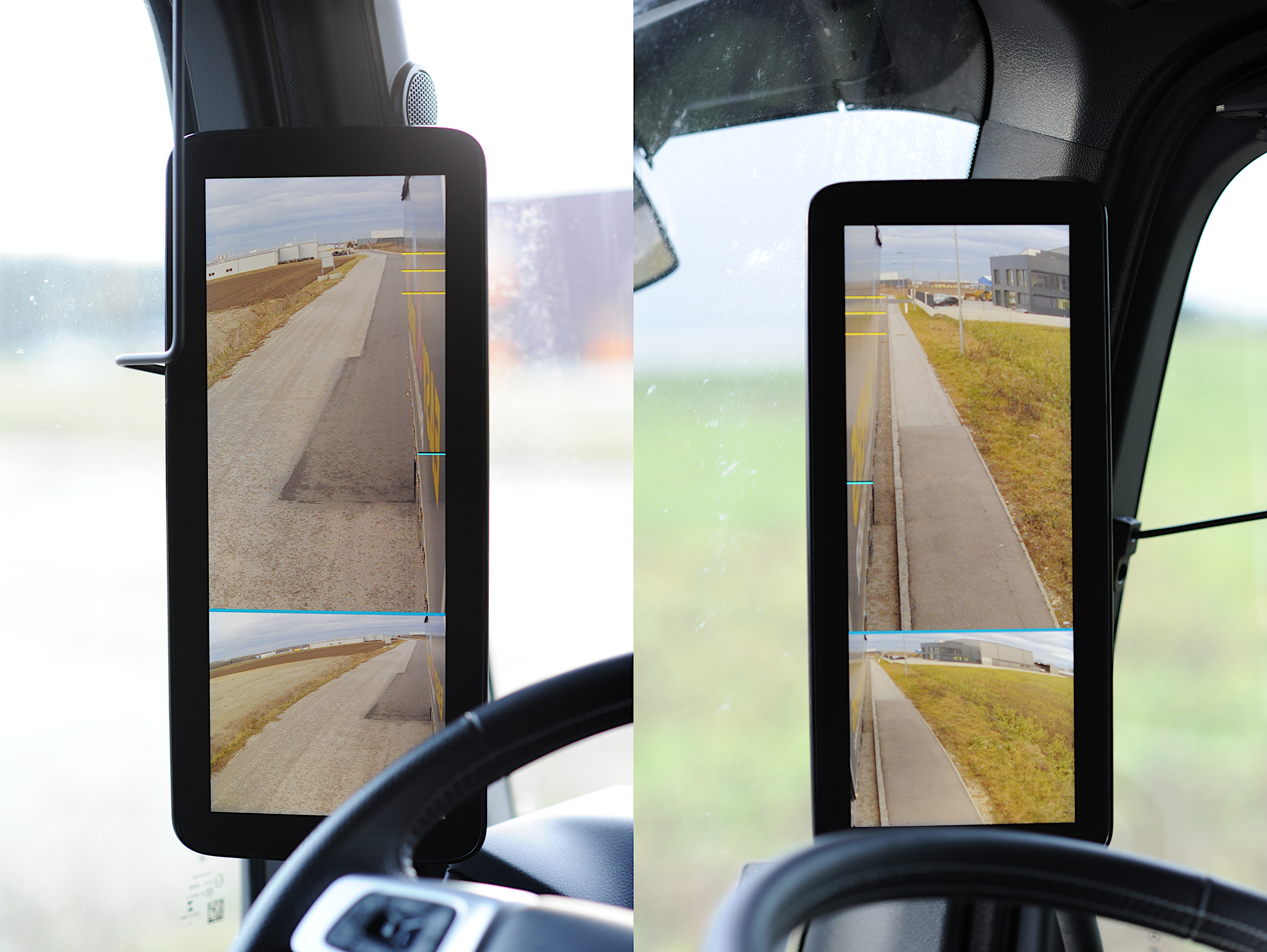
Left and right display

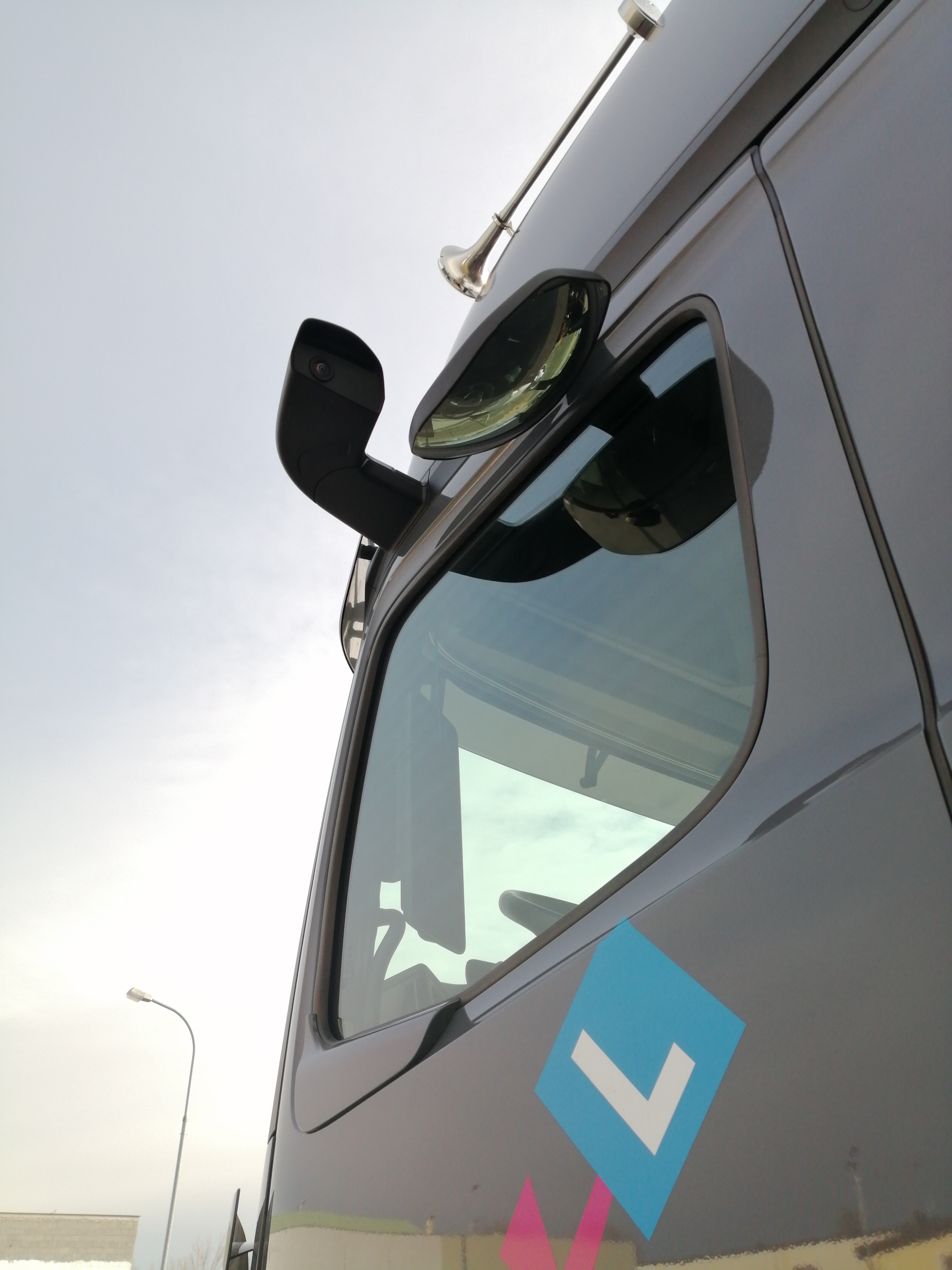
Left side camera of the digital mirrors

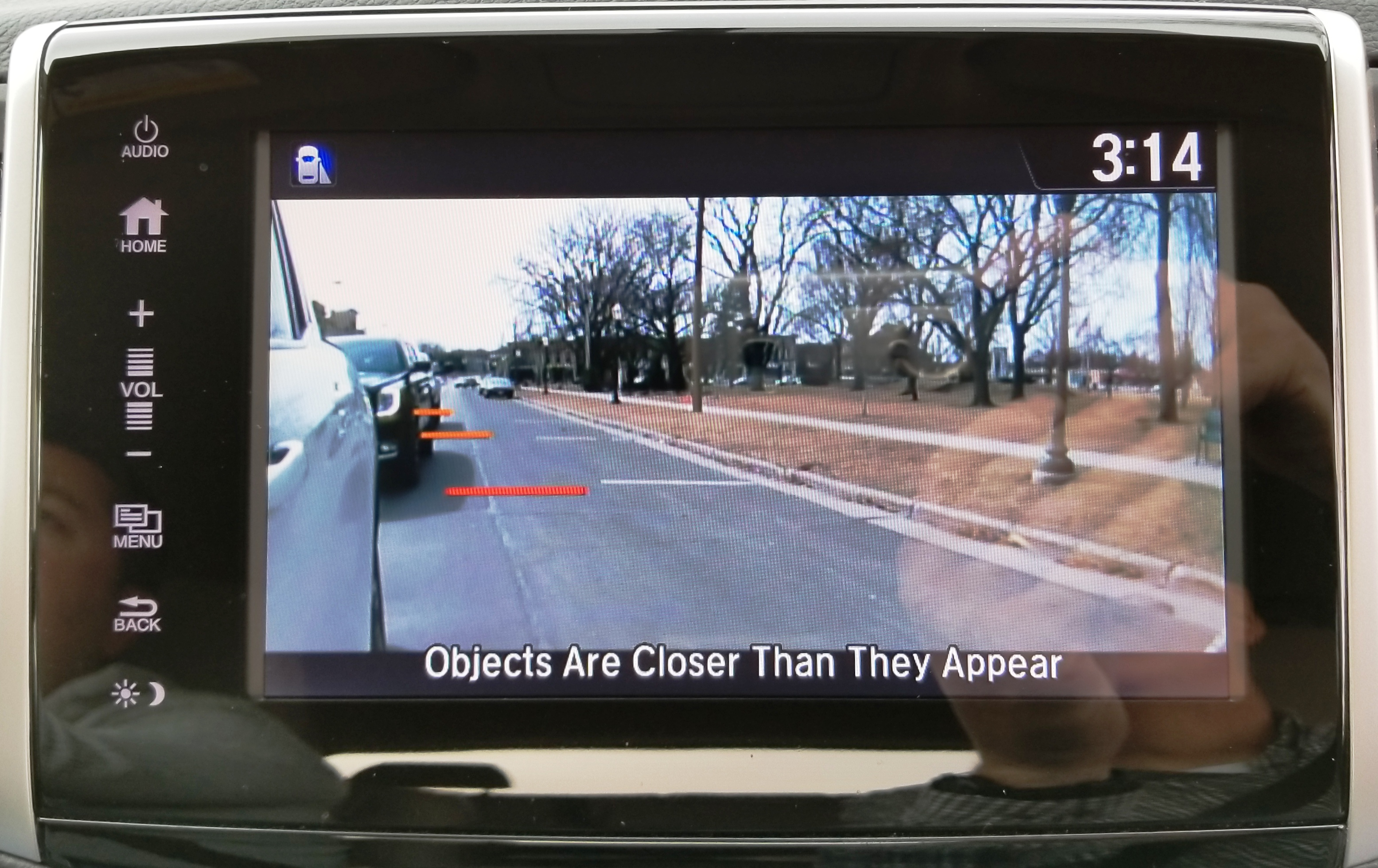
Honda's LaneWatch provides an 80° field of view with four times more visibility than traditional side-view mirrors.

== See also ==
- Automatic parking
- Backup collision
- Backup camera
- Blind spot monitor
- Blind spot (vehicle)
- Intelligent Parking Assist System
- Experimental Safety Vehicle (ESV)
- Intelligent car
- Lane departure warning system
- List of auto parts
- Precrash system
- Rear-view mirror
- Power side-view mirror
