= Backup camera =

Vehicle accessory

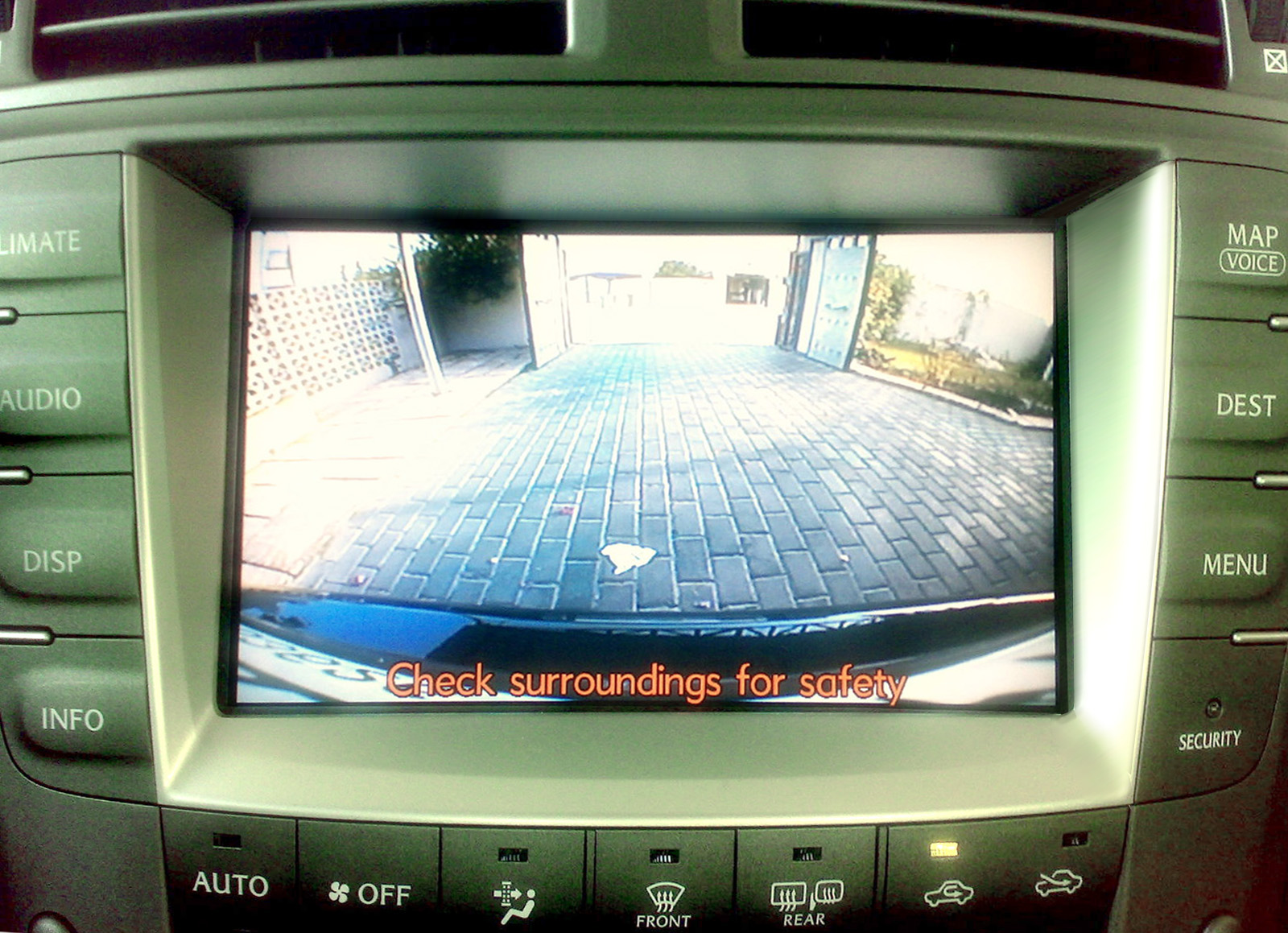
Backup camera view on the navigation screen of a Lexus IS 250

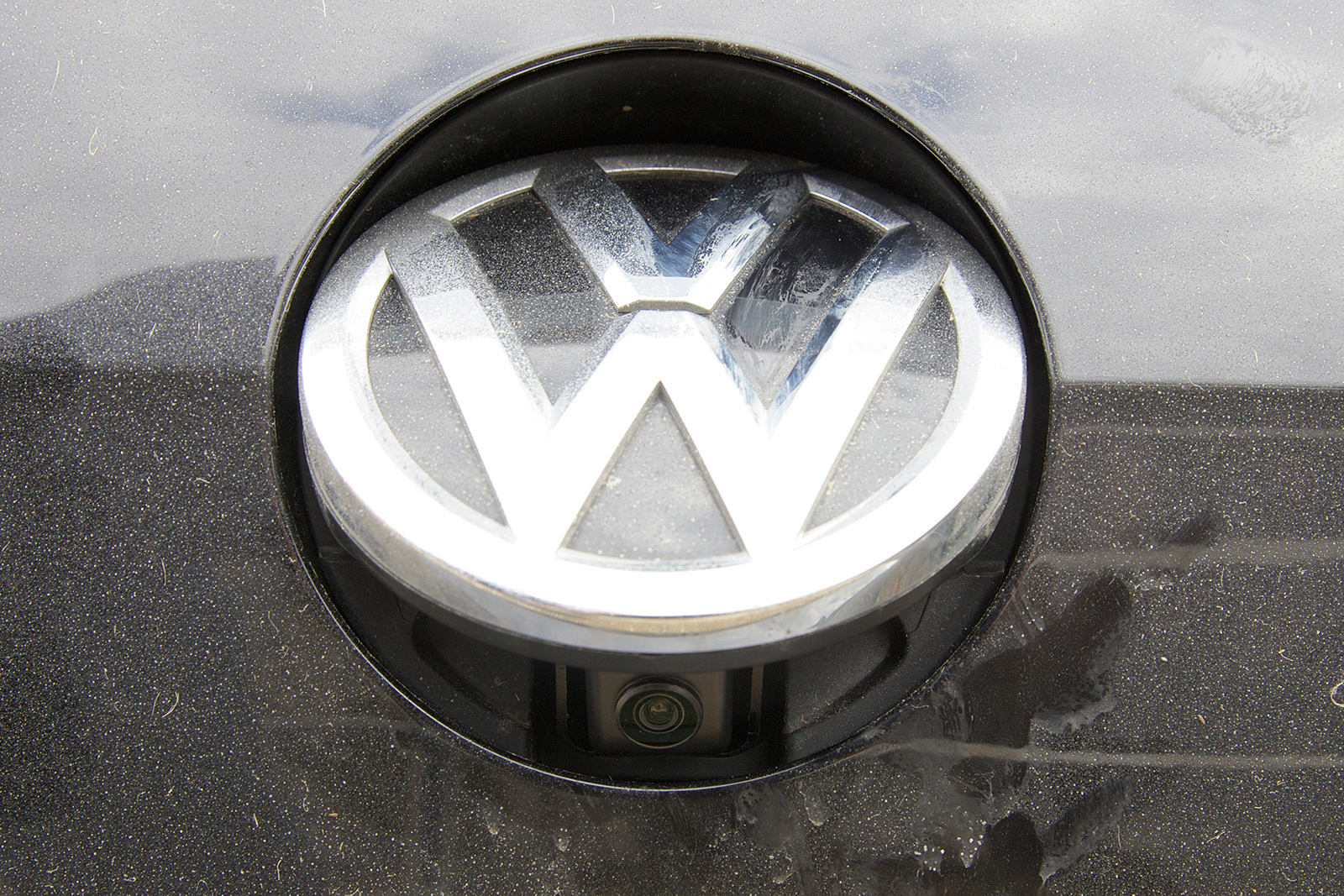
Backup camera on a Volkswagen Golf Mk7 hidden inside the logo

A backup camera (also called a reversing camera or rear-view camera) is a video camera attached to the rear of a vehicle to aid in reversing, by reducing the rear blind spot and preventing crashes with pedestrians, vehicles and other objects. Backup cameras are usually connected to the vehicle's head unit display. A common variant is a surround-view system, which assembles a synthetic but positionally accurate top-down view of the vehicle and its surroundings.

Backup cameras have been regulated by law in Canada and the United States since 2018. Since May of that year, backup cameras have been required on all new vehicles sold in the United States.

== Function ==
The design of a backup camera is distinct from other cameras because the image is horizontally flipped to produce a mirror image. This is necessary because the camera and the driver face opposite directions; without this adjustment, the camera's right would be on the driver's left and vice versa. A mirrored image makes the orientation of the display consistent with the physical mirrors installed on the vehicle.

Backup cameras typically have a wide-angle or fish-eye lens. Although such lenses may limit the camera's ability to capture distant objects, they allow the camera to see an uninterrupted horizontal path from one rear corner to the other. The camera is typically pointed at a downward angle to view potential obstacles on the ground. Modern backup cameras predominantly use ultra-wide-angle or fisheye lenses (often exceeding a 160-degree horizontal field of view) to eliminate blind spots immediately behind the vehicle. However, these lenses induce significant barrel distortion. To provide a clear and intuitive view for the driver, electronic control units (ECUs) apply real-time dewarping algorithms and Inverse Perspective Mapping (IPM). In some models the screen has a grid guide overlay to aid the driver.

Backup cameras were originally connected to the center dashboard screen, also used with GPS navigation systems and infotainment systems. The display is typically configured to automatically activate the backup camera when the transmission is set to reverse. In the late 2010s, some vehicles also have a backup screen in the roof-mounted center mirror, which can be toggled on and off by the driver. Sone vehicles also display the camera in the center dashboard screen, which is activated automatically when the driver uses the turn lights while stopped or going forward.

== Variations ==
Different varieties of backup cameras for different applications:

- Aftermarket addition: Backup cameras can be added to vehicles that do not come with factory-fitted systems. They are available in both wired and wireless versions.
- Large vehicle system: For large vehicles such as motorhomes, camera systems with built-in servomechanisms allow the driver to remotely pan and tilt the camera.
- Wireless backup camera: These come with a wireless camera and receiver, which makes them easier and cheaper to install than wired versions.
- Built-in audio intercom: Used in addition to the camera system for communicating with a spotter outside the vehicle, common when backing large trailers or launching boats.
- Night vision camera: Use a series of infrared lights for backing in the dark when the vehicle's white reverse lights are insufficient.

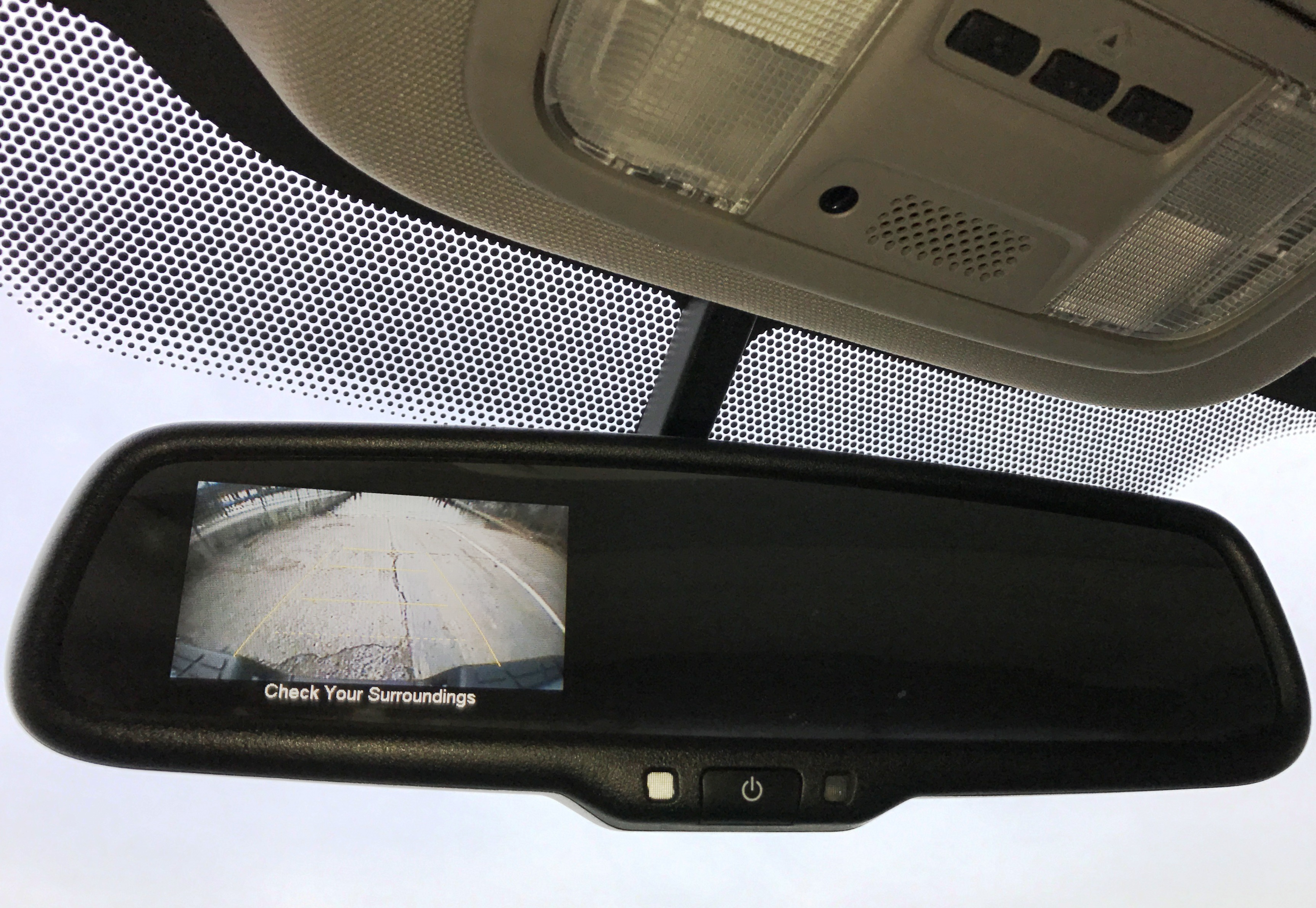
2013–2014 Honda Ridgeline rearview mirror backup camera with distance guidelines

- Portable or semi-permanent all-in-one camera system: Also known as dashboard cameras or dashcams, these are typically sold for vehicles that don't have displays permanently installed in the dashboard. Such systems consist of a small portable screen that can be affixed on the dashboard or on a rearview mirror, and a length of wire to reach the cameras, including a backup camera.
- Some backup and rear cameras are connected to displays on the rearview mirror and are used in vehicles to detect activity behind the car to "avoid the tooling, software, hardware, and testing costs associated with integrating the display/feature in other areas of the vehicle."
- License-plate-frame version: Permit installation without any permanent vehicle modifications.
- Custom camera: Brake light cameras combine a camera with brake light functionality. Some backup cameras also use LEDs surrounding the camera lens to illuminate the surroundings while in use.

== History ==
The first backup camera was used in the 1956 Buick Centurion concept car, presented in January 1956 at the General Motors Motorama. The vehicle had a rear-mounted television camera that sent images to a TV screen on the dashboard in place of the rear-view mirror.

The 1972 Volvo Experimental Safety Car (VESC) also had a backup camera, but this feature did not make it into the subsequent Volvo 240 model.

The first production automobile to incorporate a backup camera was the 1987 Toyota Crown, which was only available in Japan. The Toyota system used a color EMV screen with a rear-spoiler-mounted CCD camera. In April 2000, Nissan's Infiniti division introduced the Rear View Monitor on the 2002 Infiniti Q45 flagship sedan. Using colored on-screen guidelines as a parking distance parameter, the Rear View Monitor operated from a license-plate-mounted camera in the trunk that transmitted a mirrored image to a 7-inch in-dash LCD screen. It was available as optional equipment at the North American launch in March 2001. The 2002 Nissan Primera introduced the Rear View Monitor backup camera system to territories outside Japan and North America.

Aftermarket options for cars have been available for some time with electronics manufacturers offering multiple car upgrades that can be installed by professionals without replacing the car's center console.

== Others types of camera ==
=== Surround-view cameras ===
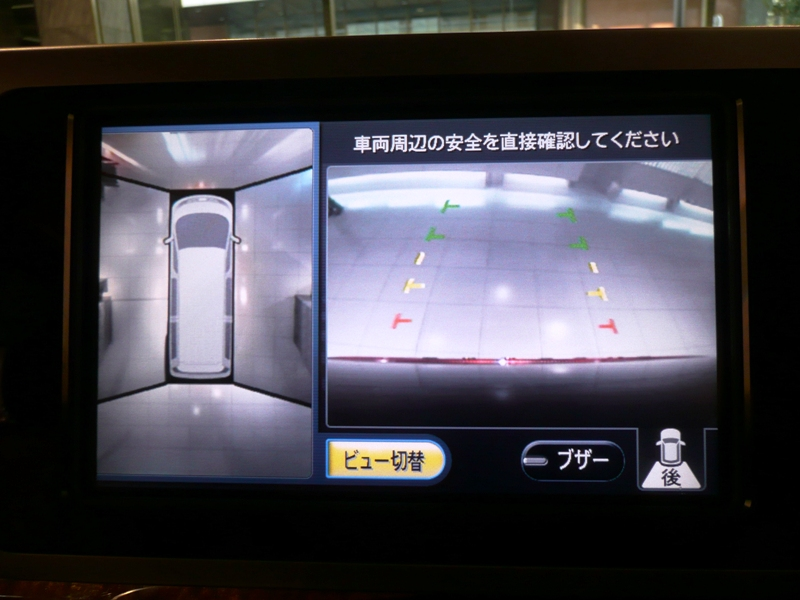
Around View Monitor on a Nissan Elgrand

Infiniti introduced the first surround-view cameras, making the system available on the 2008 EX35 and marketing it as the Around View Monitor. The system used four cameras located at the front, back, and sides of the vehicle, feeding images to an image processing unit to create a synthetic but positionally accurate top-down view of the car and its surroundings. In most modern systems, the pictures appear in such detail that it's difficult to believe they were not taken from above the vehicle.

Other manufacturers have since offered similar systems, such as Bird's Eye View Camera (Toyota) and Surround Vision (Chevrolet).

=== Side mirror cameras ===
First offered in October 2018, the Japanese market Lexus ES can be optioned with cameras as side view mirrors. This feature is also offered on the Audi Q8 e-tron and Hyundai Ioniq 5.

=== Wireless backup camera ===
These advanced cameras do not require cables between the camera and the display, functioning remotely. They typically switch on automatically when the reverse gear is engaged. Some models used solar energy for power. The display can be powered from the 12-volt socket on the car's dashboard, and some models sync directly with a mobile phone via an app.

=== Blind spot monitors and other technology ===
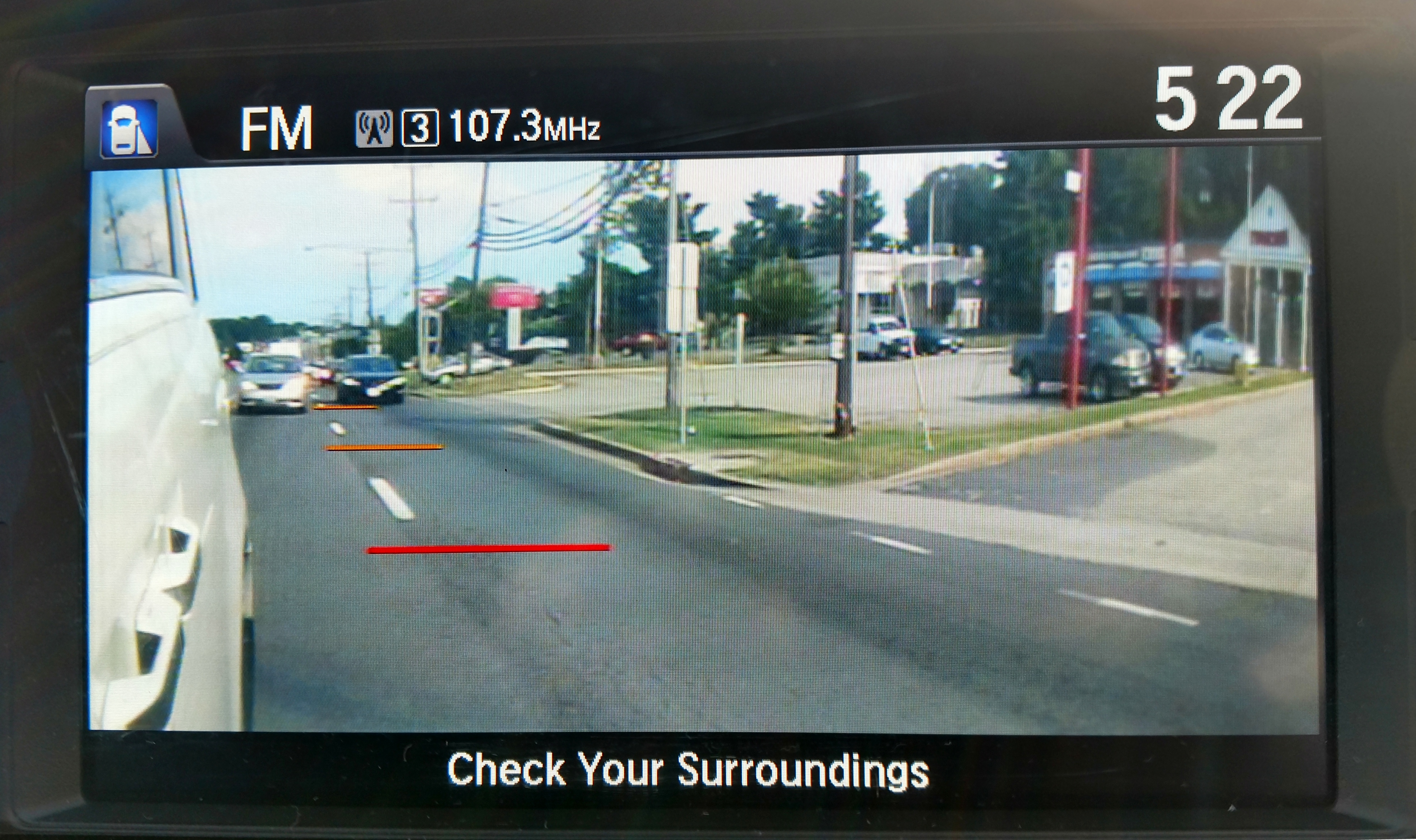
Honda's LaneWatch provides an 80° field of view that is displaced on the navigation screen with guidelines to help the driver judge distance behind the rear bumper of the vehicle.

Blind spot monitors may include "Cross Traffic Alert", which alerts drivers when traffic is approaching from the sides while backing out of a parking space.

== Mandates ==
The following countries have laws that mandate backup cameras for all new vehicles.

Country/Region	Deadline for compliance	Note	Ref
United States	May 1, 2018	Required for all vehicles under 10,000 pounds	
Canada	May 1, 2018	Required for all vehicles under 10,000 pounds (4536 kg)	
Japan	May 1, 2022		
European Union	July 6, 2022	Reversing camera or detection system is required.	
Australia	November 1, 2025	All new vehicles made from existing models will be required since 1 November 2027.	

=== United States and Canada ===
In the United States, the Cameron Gulbransen Kids Transportation Safety Act of 2007 required the United States Department of Transportation to issue backup-collision-safety regulations within three years and require full compliance within four years after final rulemaking.

The statutory deadline for issuing the final regulations was February 2011. However, the USDOT repeatedly extended the deadline to analyze costs and benefits of the requirement. In September 2013, Greg Gulbransen, the father of the child after whom the law was named, along with a group of consumers and advocates, submitted a petition to the Second Circuit Court of Appeals, demanding that the USDOT implement regulations on backup cameras within 90 days. About half of model year 2012 automobiles were equipped with backup cameras.

On March 31, 2014, three years past its deadline, the U.S. National Highway Traffic Safety Administration announced that it would require all automobiles sold in the United States built beginning in May 2018 to include backup cameras. On October 31, 2016, Transport Canada issued a similar mandate beginning at the same time.

== See also ==
- Automatic parking
- Blind spot monitor
- Collision avoidance system
- Experimental Safety Vehicle (ESV)
- Intelligent Parking Assist System
- Intelligent car
- Lane departure warning system
- Omniview technology
- Parking sensors
