= Intelligent Parking Assist System =

Automatic parking system by Toyota

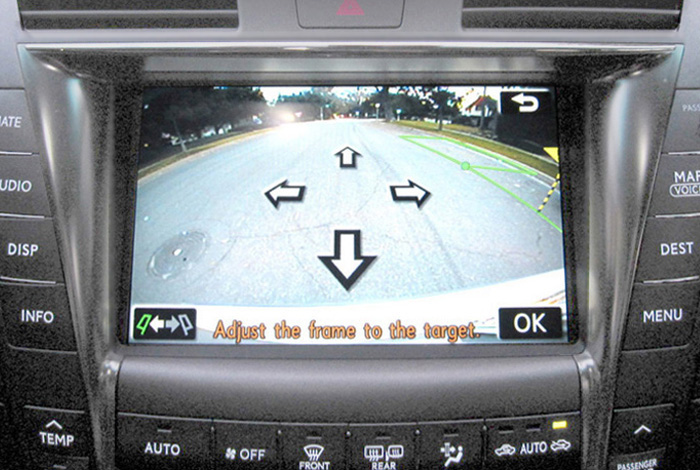
Lexus backup camera system showing the parallel park setup screen

Intelligent Parking Assist System (IPAS), also known as Advanced Parking Guidance System (APGS) for Toyota models in the United States, is the first production automatic parking system developed by Toyota Motor Corporation in 1999 initially for the Japanese market hybrid Prius models and Lexus models. The technology assists drivers in parking their vehicle. On vehicles equipped with the IPAS, via an in-dash screen and button controls, the car can steer itself into a parking space with little input from the user. The first version of the system was deployed on the Prius Hybrid sold in Japan in 2003. In 2006, an upgraded version debuted for the first time outside Japan on the Lexus LS luxury sedan, which featured the automatic parking technology among other brand new inventions from Toyota. In 2009, the system appeared on the third generation Prius sold in the U.S. In Asia and Europe, the parking technology is marketed as the Intelligent Park Assist System for both Lexus and Toyota models, while in the U.S. the Advanced Parking Guidance System name is only used for the Lexus system.

== Development ==
The initial version of the Intelligent Parking Assist System, launched in 2003, was designed for reverse parallel parking. Driver intervention was not required, as the system estimated the size of the parking space and maneuvered the vehicle appropriately. This was done by an onboard computer which used a camera built into the forward and rear of the car. Sensors located at similar locations detected the proximity of nearby vehicles. The dashboard displayed an image of the lot, and the driver would then have to determine the exact position that the vehicle in the lot via the arrows which appeared on the screen. Using the arrows, the user would set the location of the vehicle in the space. When satisfied, the user pressed the "Set" button, which then activated the IPAS. The system then took over steering control to maneuver the vehicle.

Early versions of this system had difficulty detecting objects, including cats, baby prams and pedestrians. Secondly when the driver activated the system in a too small a space, the system constantly flashed warning signals to inform the user of the danger of hitting the vehicle. User assistance is required in such situations. In 2005, an upgraded version added recognition capability for parking stripes. A later version of this parking technology, launched in 2006, added integration with parking sensors. This latest version could calculate the steering maneuvers needed for parallel or reverse parking, and help determine that the car has enough clearance for a particular space with colored screen displays which indicated adequate or inadequate space.

== How it works ==
=== Technology ===
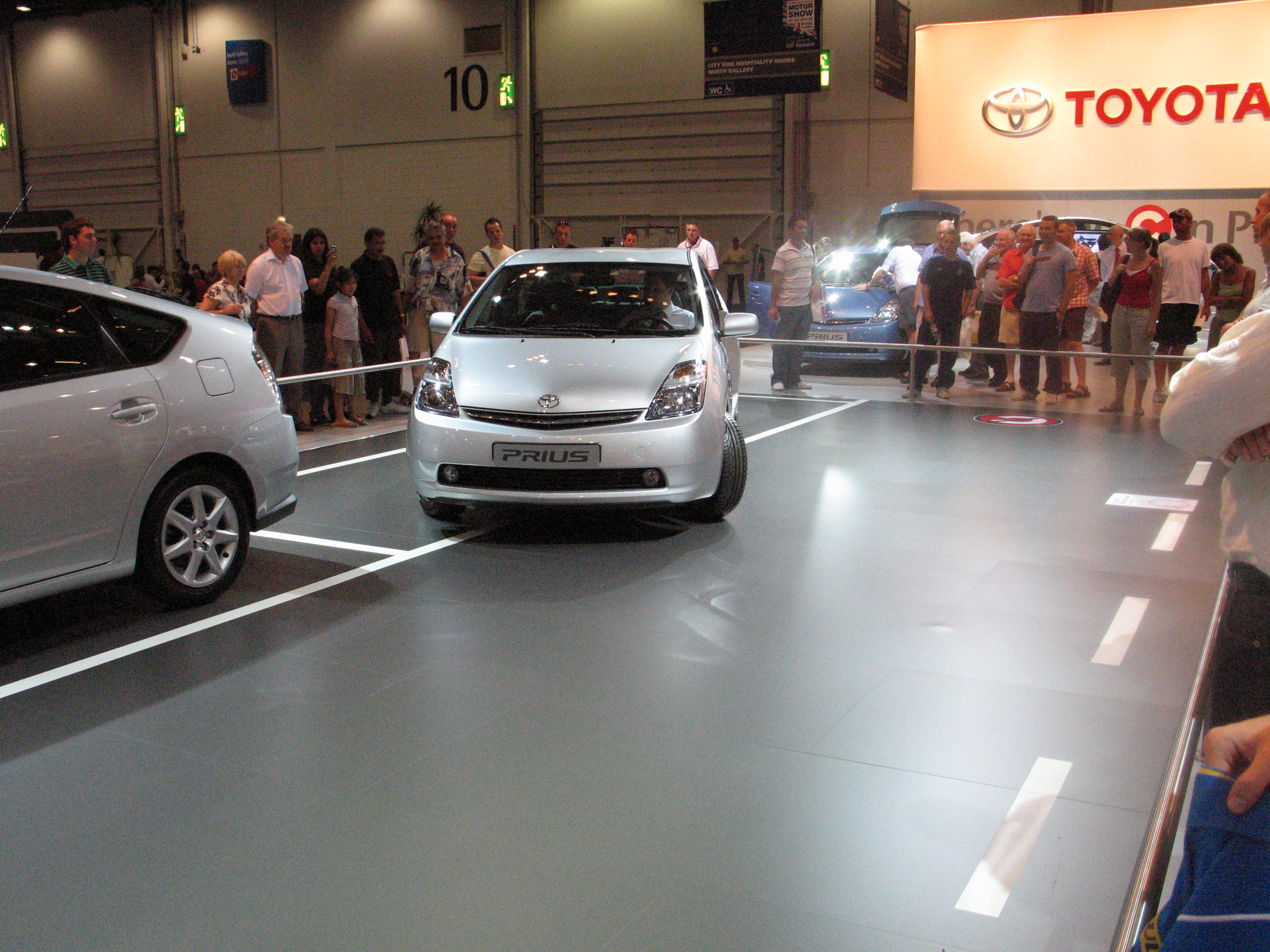
Demonstration of the parallel parking system on a Toyota Prius

The IPAS/APGS use computer processors which are tied to the vehicle's sonar warning system feature, backup camera, and two additional forward sensors on the front side fenders. The sonar park sensors, known as "Intuitive Parking Assist" or "Lexus Park Assist", include multiple sensors on the forward and rear bumpers which detect obstacles, allowing the vehicle to sound warnings and calculate optimum steering angles during regular parking. These sensors plus the two additional parking sensors are tied to a central computer processor, which in turn is integrated with the backup camera system to provide the driver parking information.

When the sonar park sensors feature is used, the processor(s) calculate steering angle data which are displayed on the navigation/camera touchscreen along with obstacle information. The Intelligent Parking Assist System expands on this capability and is accessible when the vehicle is shifted to reverse (which automatically activates the backup camera). When in reverse, the backup camera screen features parking buttons which can be used to activate automated parking procedures. When the Intelligent Parking Assist System is activated, the central processor calculates the optimum parallel or reverse park steering angles and then interfaces with the Electric Power Steering systems of the vehicle to guide the car into the parking spot.

=== Functions ===
Newer versions of the system allow parallel or reverse parking. When parallel parking with the system, drivers first pull up alongside the parking space. They move forward until the vehicle's rear bumper passes the rear wheel of the car parked in front of the open space. Then, shifting to reverse automatically activates the backup camera system, and the car's rear view appears on dash navigation/camera display. The driver's selection of the parallel park guidance button on the navigation/camera touchscreen causes a grid to appear (with green or red lines, a flag symbol representing the corner of the parking spot, and adjustment arrows).

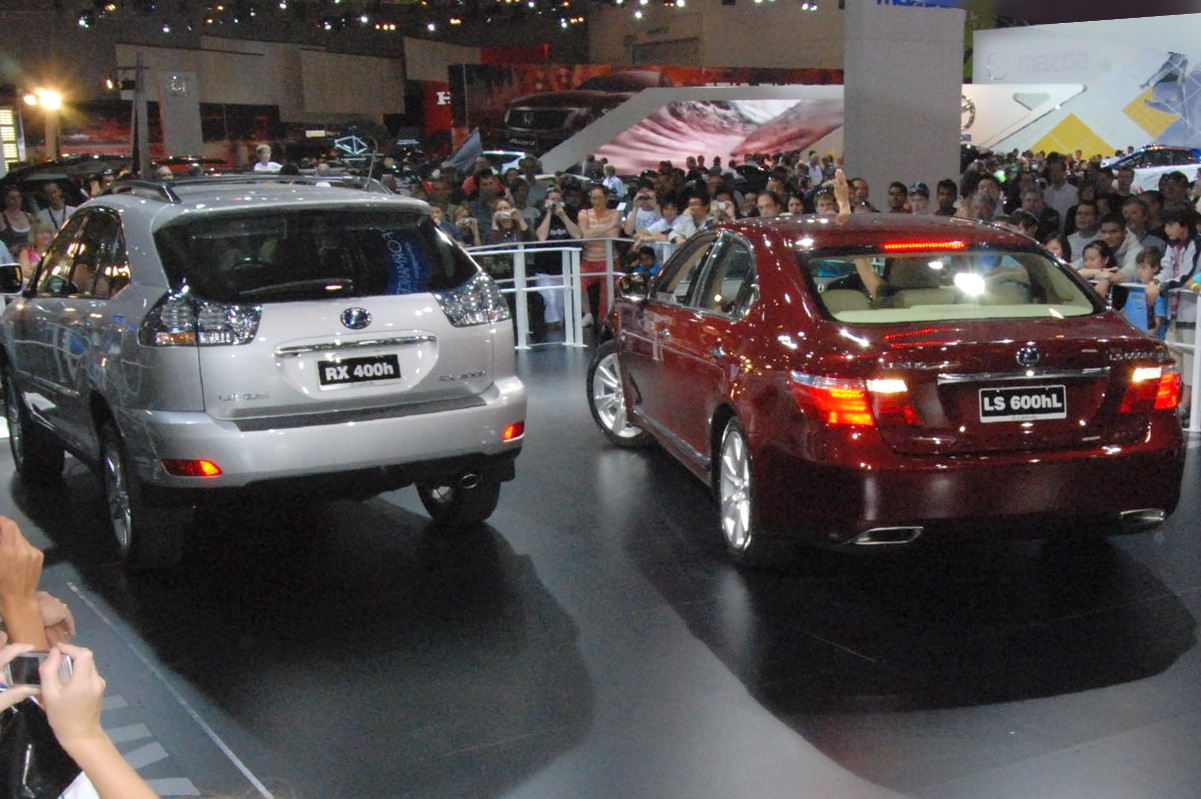
Demonstration of the automatic parking system on a Lexus LS

The driver is responsible for checking to see if the representative box on the screen correctly identifies the parking space; if the space is large enough to park, the box will be green in color; if the box is incorrectly placed, or lined in red, using the arrow buttons moves the box until it turns green. Once the parking space is correctly identified, the driver presses OK and takes his/her hands off the steering wheel, while keeping the foot on the brake pedal. When the driver slowly releases the brake, while keeping the foot on the brake pedal, the car will then begin to back up and steer itself into the parking space.

The reverse parking procedure is virtually identical to the parallel parking procedure. The driver approaches the parking space, moving forward and turning, positioning the car in place for backing into the reverse parking spot. The vehicle rear has to be facing the reverse parking spot, allowing the backup camera to 'see' the parking area. Shifting to reverse automatically activates the backup camera system, and the driver selects the reverse park guidance button on the navigation/camera touchscreen (the grid appears with green or red lines, a flag symbol representing the corner of the parking spot, and adjustment arrows; reverse parking adds rotation selection). After checking the parking space and engaging the reverse park procedure, the same exact parking process occurs as the car reverse parks into the spot.

The system is set up so that at any time the steering wheel is touched or the brake firmly pressed, the automatic parking will disengage. The vehicle also cannot exceed a set speed, or the system will deactivate. When the car's computer voice issues the statement "The guidance is finished", the system has finished parking the car. The driver can then shift to drive and make adjustments in the space if necessary.

== Media coverage ==
=== Press reports ===
The debut of the parking technology in the United States in 2006 received widespread media attention, with demonstrations performed on television shows ranging from cable news programming to The Oprah Winfrey Show. In automotive publications, the feature garnered mixed reviews, with opinions on its utility varying from useful to impractical, depending on the parking situation and driver.

A video from CNBC showed the system working "quite effectively" with a first-time user and other reviewers found that the system worked smoothly. A video produced by Automobile Magazine demonstrates how the system makes parking more difficult, due to some complexity to the touchscreen.

- Lexus LS 460 L Self Parking Video on YouTube A demonstration by Winding Road magazine.

=== Advertising ===
Lexus capitalized on the debut of the parking system in the U.S. with its LS flagship with two ads. The first, "Pyramid," depicted a driver parking a car between two stacks of glasses using the system. A second ad showing a montage of different technologies, followed finally by a demonstration of the parallel park feature, and a man stating that he never thought this technology could possibly exist.

The system was also referenced by competitors Audi and Hyundai in their own advertisements. Audi marketed their 2007 A4 as "the luxury car for people who can park themselves," and showed a professional driver swing into a tight parallel parking space. Hyundai's advertisement for the 2007 Azera listed a side-by-side feature comparison between the Azera and the LS460, reaching a conclusion that although the Azera lacks the style, luxury, performance, class, and comfort of the LS, its savings can pay for valet.

== See also ==
- Automatic parking
- Lexus
- Toyota Motor Corporation
- Parallel parking
- Parking sensors
- Backup camera
