= Straith =

Straith may refer to:

== Surname ==
- Adam Straith (born 1990), Canadian soccer player
- Claire L. Straith (1891–1958), American plastic surgeon
- William Thomas Straith (1894–1980), Canadian politician
