= Green Car =

Green Car may refer to:

- Green vehicle, a motor vehicle more environmentally friendly than the norm
- First class travel, accommodations on many Japanese train lines
- "The Green Car", an episode of Infinity Train

== See also ==
- Car colour popularity
