= Passenger safety =

Passenger safety may refer to:

- Automobile safety
- Aviation safety
- Rail safety
