= PCAM =

PCAM may refer to:

- Pacific Coast Air Museum, a non-profit organization dedicated to promoting and preserving aviation history
- Pacific Coast Association of Magicians, an American association of illusionists
- Pedestrian crash avoidance mitigation, the use of AI to recognize pedestrians and avoid crashes
- Platelet/endothelial cell adhesion molecule, an adhesion molecule on the surface of platelets, monocytes, neutrophils, and some types of T-cells
- Professional Community Association Manager
- Punch-Card Accounting Machines, a type of unit record equipment produced by IBM
- pCAM, an abbreviation for "precursor to cathode active material"
