= Autonomous things =

Autonomous things, abbreviated AuT, or the Internet of autonomous things, abbreviated as IoAT, is an emerging term for the technological developments that are expected to bring computers into the physical environment as autonomous entities without human direction, freely moving and interacting with humans and other objects.

Self-navigating drones are the first AuT technology in (limited) deployment. It is expected that the first mass-deployment of AuT technologies will be the autonomous car, generally expected to be available around 2020. Other currently expected AuT technologies include home robotics (e.g., machines that provide care for the elderly, infirm or young), and military robots (air, land or sea autonomous machines with information-collection or target-attack capabilities).

AuT technologies share many common traits, which justify the common notation. They are all based on recent breakthroughs in the domains of (deep) machine learning and artificial intelligence. They all require extensive and prompt regulatory developments to specify the requirements from them and to license and manage their deployment (see the further reading below). And they all require unprecedented levels of safety (e.g., automobile safety) and security, to overcome concerns about the potential negative impact of the new technology.

As an example, the autonomous car both addresses the main existing safety issues and creates new issues. It is expected to be much safer than existing vehicles, by eliminating the single most dangerous element – the driver. The US's National Highway Traffic Safety Administration estimates 94 percent of US accidents were the result of human error and poor decision-making, including speeding and impaired driving, and the Center for Internet and Society at Stanford Law School claims that "Some ninety percent of motor vehicle crashes are caused at least in part by human error". So while safety standards like the ISO 26262 specify the required safety, there is still a burden on the industry to demonstrate acceptable safety.

While car accidents claim every year 35,000 lives in the US, and 1.25 million worldwide, some believe that even "a car that's 10 times as safe, which means 3,500 people die on the roads each year [in the US alone]" would not be accepted by the public. The acceptable level may be closer to the current figures on aviation accidents and incidents, with under a thousand worldwide deaths in most years – three orders of magnitude lower than cars. This underscores the unprecedented nature of the safety requirements that will need to be met for cars, with similar levels of safety expected for other Autonomous Things.
