= Pedestrian safety in vehicle design =

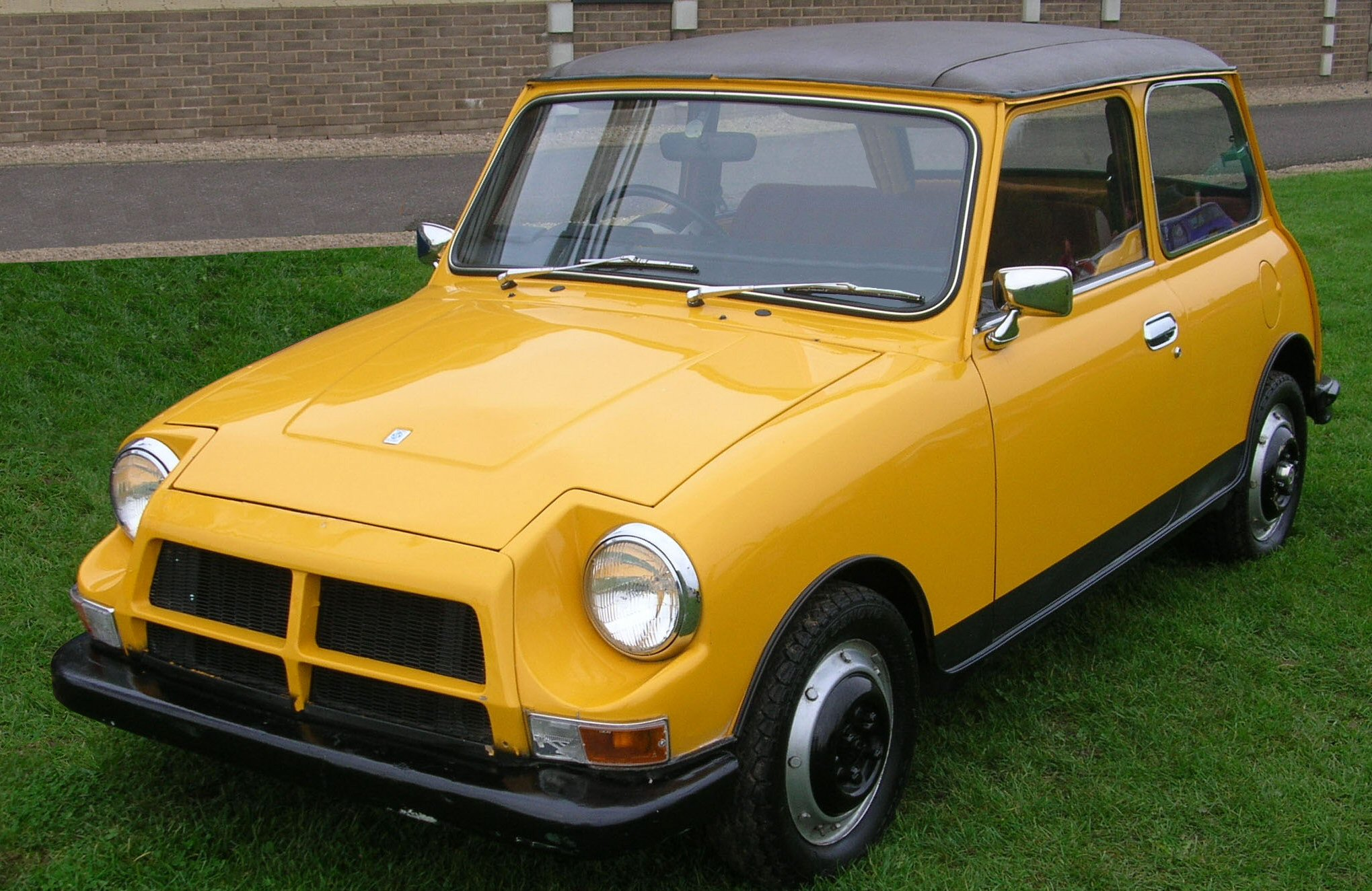
One of a series of safety research vehicles produced by British Leyland in the 1970s including a pedestrian-friendly bonnet

Road vehicles designed to be slower and lighter are generally safer for pedestrians. A quarter of a million pedestrians lost their lives on the world’s roads in 2021. Despite the magnitude of the problem, most attempts at increasing pedestrian safety had historically focused solely on education and traffic regulation. Since the 1970s, crash engineers have begun to use design principles that have proved successful in protecting car occupants to develop vehicle design concepts that reduce the likelihood of injuries to pedestrians in the event of a car-pedestrian crash, or reduce the likelihood of a car-pedestrian crash in the first place.

These involve redesigning the bumper, hood (bonnet), windshield and pillar to be energy absorbing (softer) without compromising the structural integrity of the car. With the advent of ADAS (Automated Advanced Driver Assist Systems) since 2005, new pedestrian detection and crash avoidance and mitigation systems offer improvements through active rather than passive protection systems. For example, omniview technology allows a driver to see what is around the vehicle before moving. More regions are requiring heavy vehicles to have direct vision of pedestrians, rather than relying on mirrors.

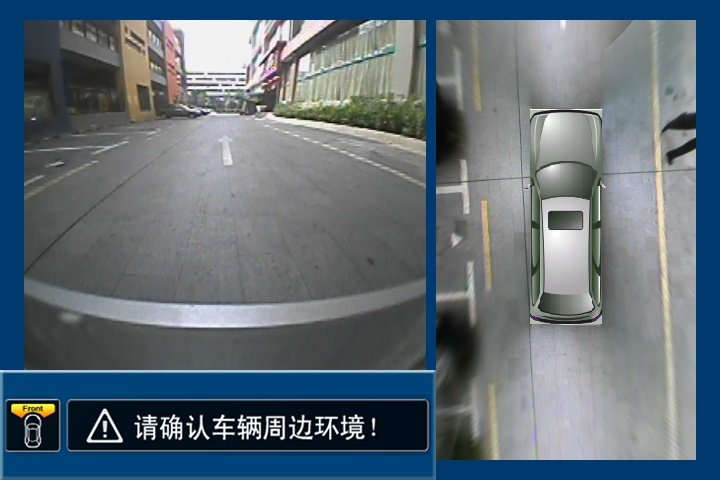
Omniview technology gives the impression of looking down on the space around the car, and allows the driver to see people and objects in the immediate vicinity before moving off.

Other trends in vehicle design have increased pedestrian fatalities, like increased vehicle weight and bonnet height. Taller bonnets are thought to increase the likelihood of a crash due to greater obstruction of the motorist's vision, and to increase the severity of crash injuries.

== Anatomy of a pedestrian crash ==
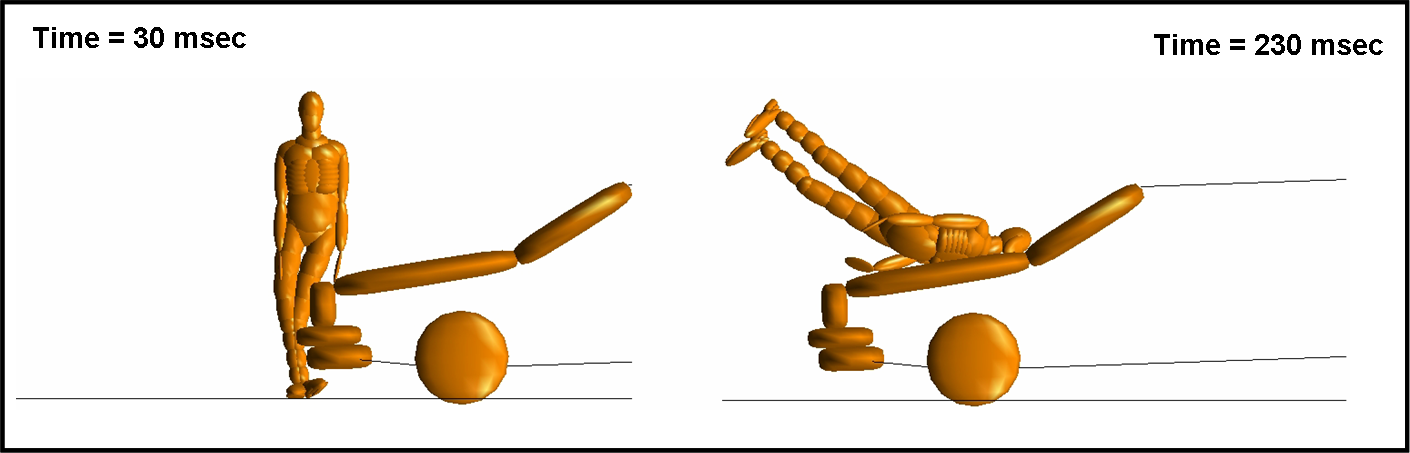
The sequence of events in a car-pedestrian crash

Many pedestrian crashes involve a forward moving car (as opposed to buses and other vehicles with a vertical hood/bonnet). In such a crash, a standing or walking pedestrian is struck and accelerated to the speed of the car and then continues forward as the car brakes to a halt. The pedestrian is impacted twice, first by the car and then by the ground, but most of the fatal injuries occur due to interaction with the car. Vehicle designers usually focus on understanding the car-pedestrian interaction, which is characterized by the following sequence of events: the vehicle bumper first contacts the lower limbs of the pedestrian, the leading edge of the hood hits the upper thigh or pelvis, and the head and upper torso are struck by the top surface of the hood and/or windshield.

== Reducing pedestrian injuries ==
Most pedestrian deaths occur due to the traumatic brain injury resulting from the hard impact of the head against the stiff hood or windshield.^{[2]} In addition, although usually non-fatal, injuries to the lower limb (usually to the knee joint and long bones) are the most common cause of disabilities. A Frontal Protection System (FPS) is a device fitted to the front end of a vehicle to protect both pedestrians and cyclists in the event of a front-end collision. Car design has been shown to have a large impact on the scope and severity of pedestrian injury in car crashes.^{[3]}

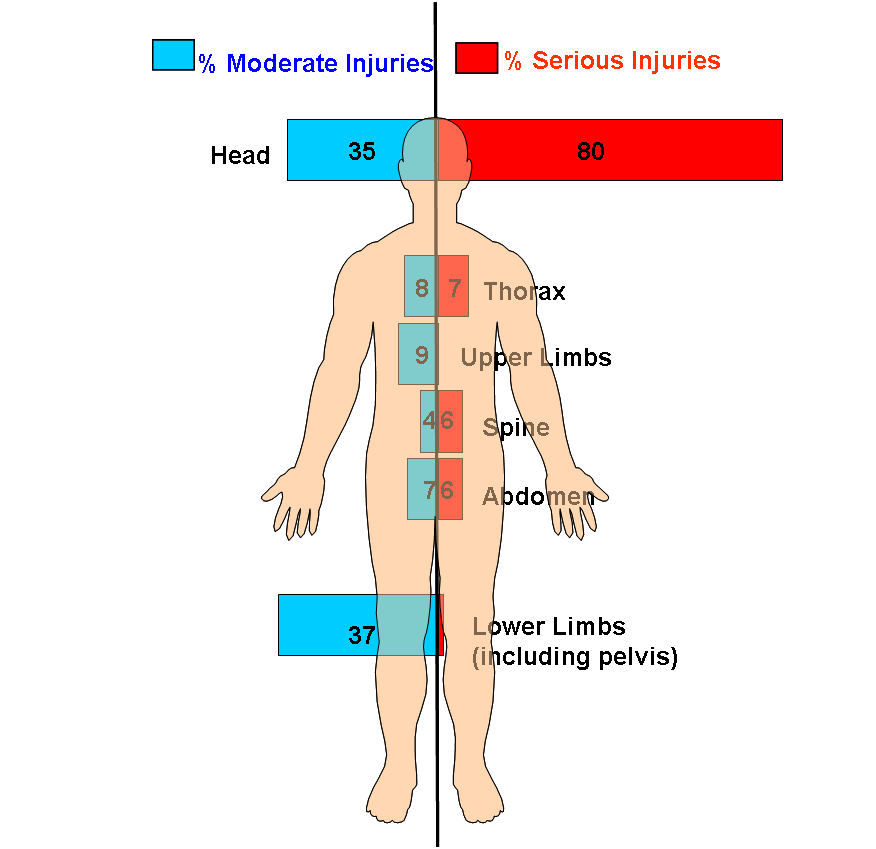
While the lower limb is the most commonly injured body region, most pedestrian fatalities are caused by head injuries.^{[3]}

Volvo has created a pedestrian and cycle recognition ADAS with automatic braking designed to reduce pedestrian collisions. Some car models also have 'dooring' technology, to prevent car doors being opened onto oncoming cyclists.

=== Protecting the head ===
The hood of most vehicles is usually fabricated from sheet metal, which is a compliant energy absorbing structure which poses a comparatively small threat. Most serious head injuries occur when there is insufficient clearance between the hood and the stiff underlying engine components. A gap of approximately 10 cm is usually enough to allow the pedestrian’s head to have a controlled deceleration and a significantly reduced risk of death.

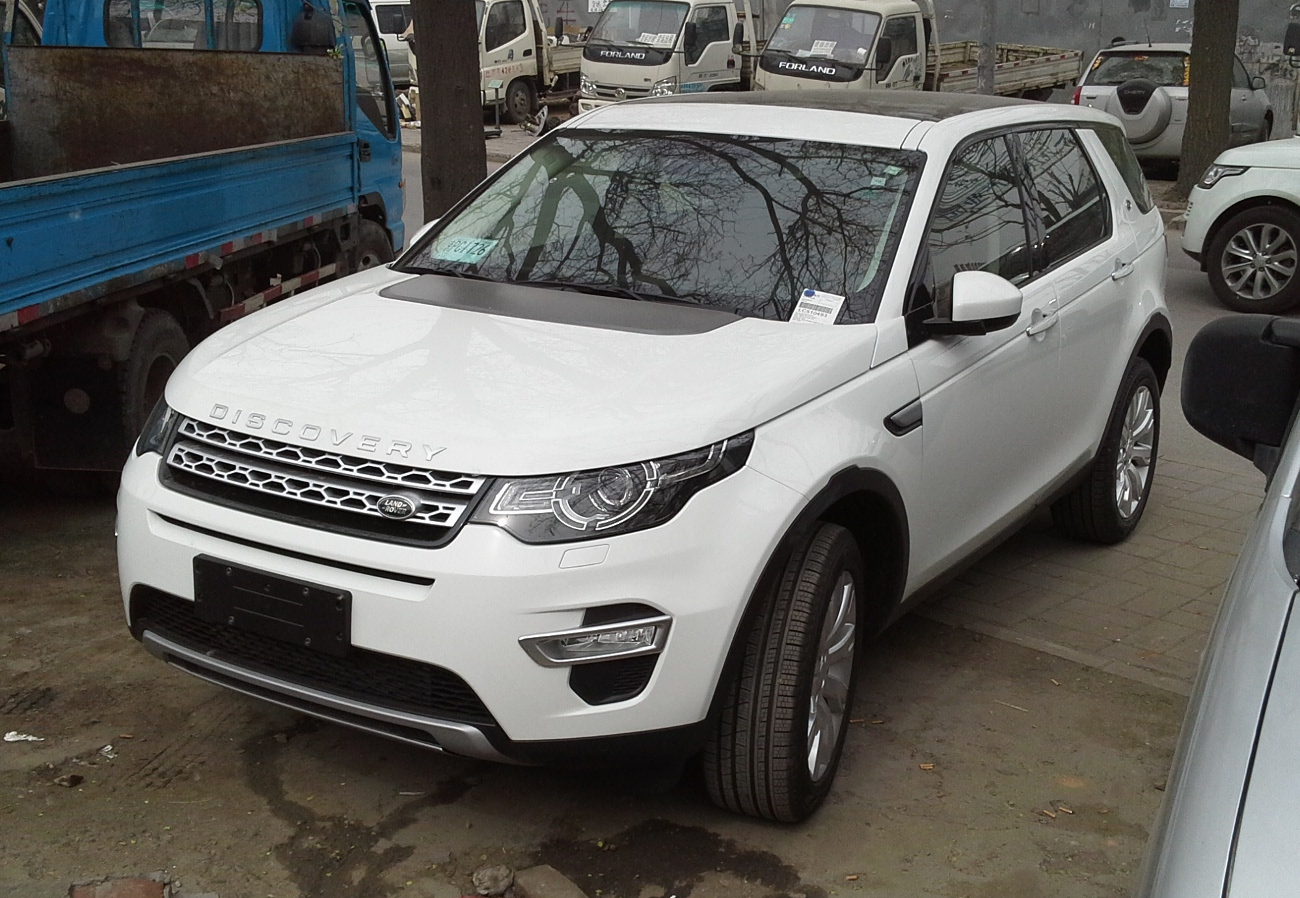
Land Rover Discovery Sport showing the pedestrian airbag (in gray) at the rear of the hood

Engineers have attempted to overcome this problem by using deformable mounts, and by developing more ambitious solutions such as airbags that are activated during the crash and cover the stiff regions of the hood. Some models, like the Citroën C6 and Jaguar XK feature a novel pop-up bonnet design, which adds 6.5 cm (2.5", C6) extra clearance over the engine block if the bumper senses a hit. In 2012 and 2015, the Volvo V40 and the Land Rover Discovery Sport have an under-the hood airbag designed to operate if the hood senses a hit. The airbag is also designed to cover the windshield pillars to help protect the pedestrian's head. However, these pedestrian airbags have not been taken up widely.

=== Protecting the limbs ===
Most limb injuries occur due to a direct blow from the bumper and the leading edge of the hood. This leads to contact fractures of the femur and the tibia/fibula and damage to the knee ligaments due to bending of the joint. Thus, attempts at reducing these injuries involve reducing the peak contact forces by making the bumper softer and increasing the contact area and by limiting the amount of knee bending by modifying the geometry of the front end of the car. Computer simulations and experiments with cadavers show that when cars have lower bumpers, the thigh and leg rotate together causing the knee to bend less and thus reducing the likelihood of ligament injuries. Deeper bumper profiles and structures under the bumper (such as the air dam) can also assist in limiting the rotation of the leg.

== Design trends and safety ratings ==
After decades of decline, US pedestrian deaths have increased since 2009. A New York Times study concluded that higher hoods and larger vehicle blind spots from progressively larger pickups and SUVs is responsible for part of the increase.

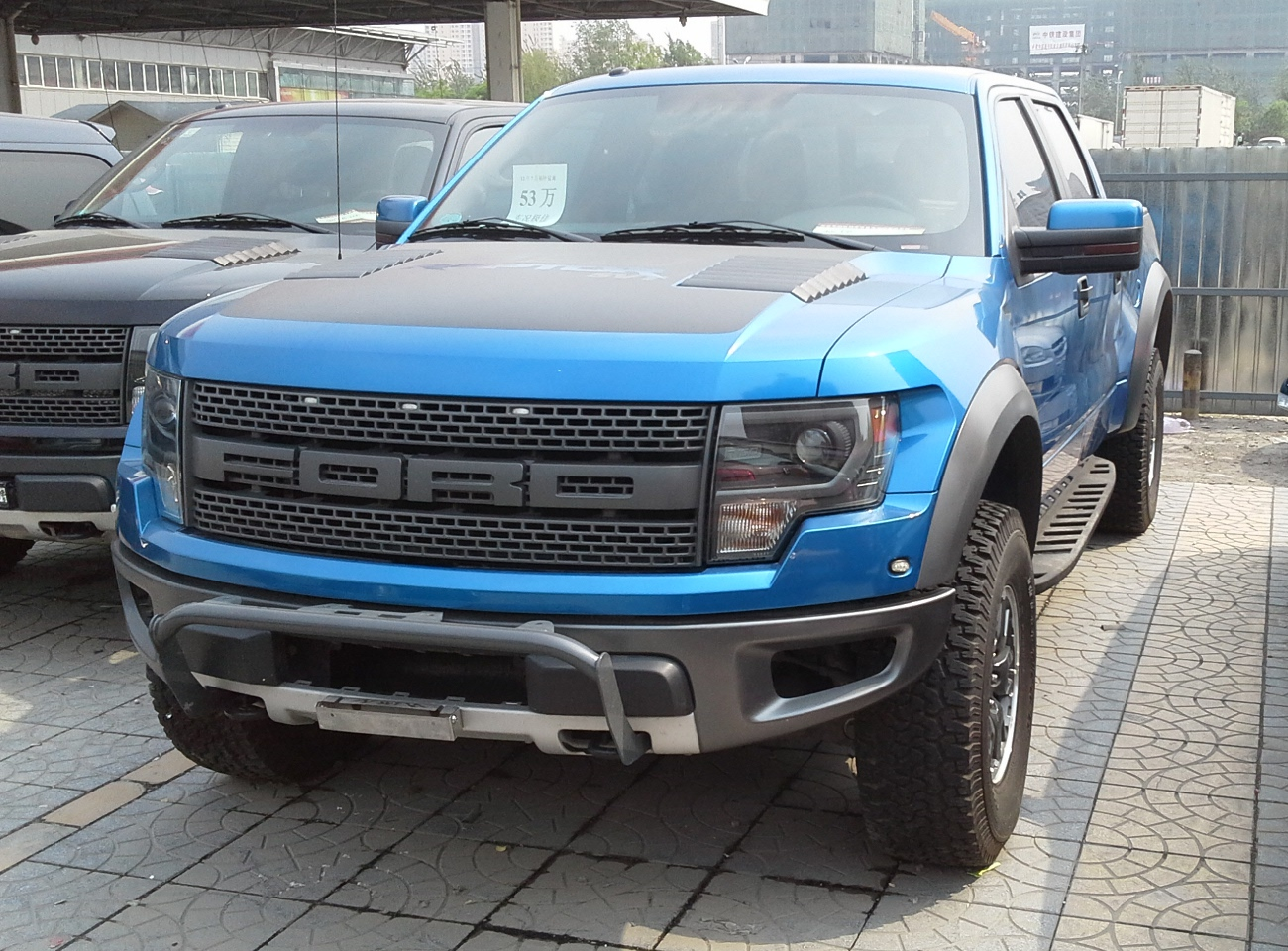
Tall and blocky front grilles have led to increased pedestrian and cyclist fatalities.

The 21st century saw vehicle designs trending toward larger, taller front grilles that tended to kill more pedestrians. A 2024 study regressed US crash statistics to find that an extra 10 cm (3.9 in) of bonnet height corresponded to a 22% increase in pedestrian fatalities. A study by the US IIHS found that a bonnet height over 1 m (39 in) corresponded to a 45% increase in pedestrian fatalities. In addition to making crashes more catastrophic by transferring more energy to a pedestrian, high-bonnet vehicles also tend to have larger blind spots, making a crash more likely.

Pedestrian safety may or may not figure into automobile safety rating systems by jurisdiction. In the United States, the New Car Assessment Program from the National Highway Transportation Safety Administration historically has not considered pedestrian safety in its scoring, and hence provided no disincentive for manufacturers who made increasingly blocky front grilles. Pedestrian-focussed additions to the Assessment Program, including pedestrian automatic emergency braking, were delayed in 2025 at the request of motordom. The Euro NCAP, Japan NCAP and Australasian New Car Assessment Program tests, on the other hand, figure vulnerable Road Users into their ratings and de-rate vehicles that perform poorly on these tests.

== See also ==
- Autobesity
- Driver visibility
- Motorcycle Safety
- Road safety
- Safety of self-driving cars
