= Vehicle safety technology =

Special technology developed to ensure the safety and security of automobiles

Vehicle safety technology (VST) in the automotive industry refers to the special technology developed to ensure the safety and security of automobiles and their passengers. The term encompasses a broad umbrella of projects and devices within the automotive world. Notable examples of VST include geo-fencing capabilities, remote speed sensing, theft deterrence, damage mitigation, vehicle-to-vehicle communication, and car-to-computer communication devices which use GPS tracking.

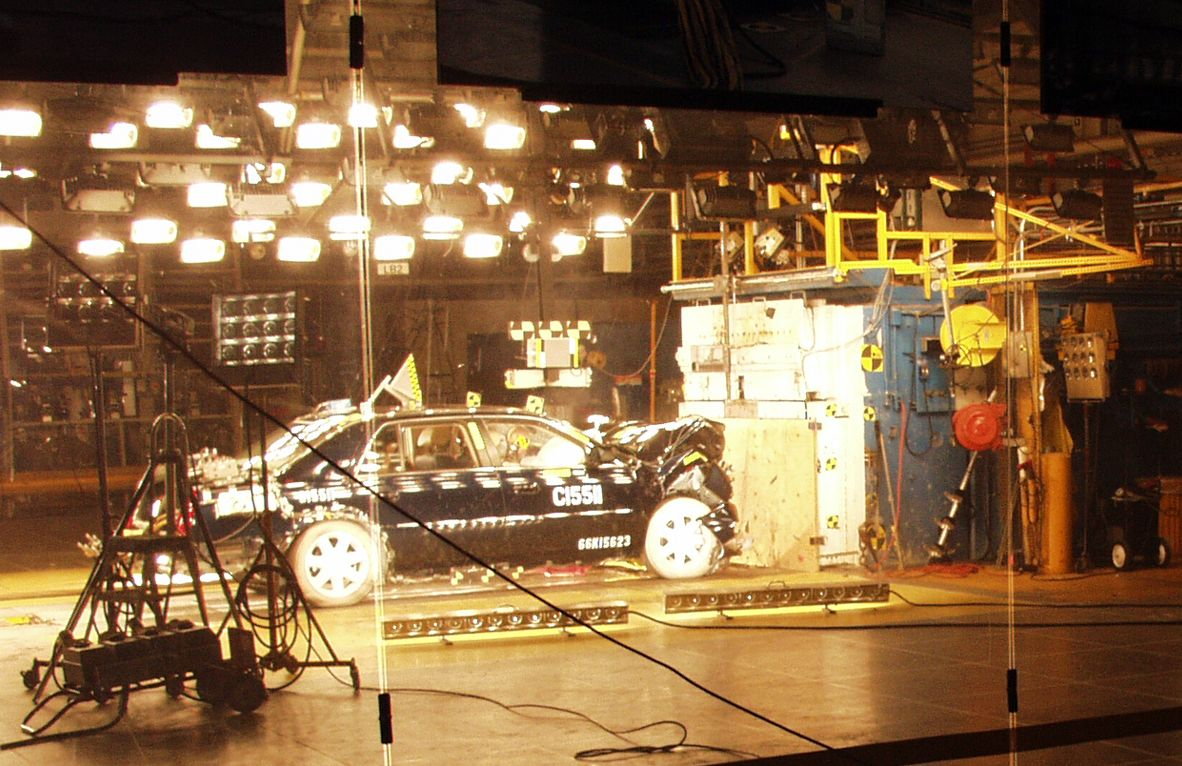
Picture of a crash test performed at General Motors

Examples of VST were first implemented in the 20th century, when they were introduced by the automobile industry in response to legislators' efforts to reduce the number of road accidents. Early examples of VST included safety glass, four-wheel hydraulic brakes, seat belts, and padded dashboards. In 1934, General Motors began a scientific approach to vehicle safety by conducting the first crash barrier test. Gradually, existing systems were stabilized, followed by the introduction of disc brakes and anti-lock braking systems. High-tech safety systems were first introduced in 1995 with Electronic Stability Control (ESC). Lane departure warning systems were introduced in the year 1999, and radar assisted adaptive cruise control was introduced in 2005. However, these technologies are not standard inclusions in all vehicles.

== Continued development of vehicle safety technology ==
In 2017, fatalities of vehicle accidents totaled 37,133, with 3,166 of those resulting from distraction-related vehicle crashes. Research has shown that a majority of these crashes were due to human error. Because of this, the government-funded National Highway Traffic Safety Administration (NHSTA) recommends that consumers now look for VST features when purchasing a vehicle. The NHTSA takes part in the research, development, and implementation of vehicle safety technologies, including forward collision warning, automatic emergency braking, pedestrian automatic emergency braking, and adaptive lighting, among others. The potential amount lives that VST will save is vast, and the NHTSA is committed to making driving safer through the continued creation of new technologies and expansion of existing ones. The United States Department of Transportation is also continuously seeking new methods of VST to combat the annual vehicular related deaths of over 30,000 people. New safety technology is implemented with the manufacture of each new vehicle model, introducing better means of combating human error and creating a safer space on roads. This constant advancement is backed by a 3.9 billion US dollar governmental investment over a ten-year period into VSTs. In addition, the NHTSA continues to issue new regulations and exemptions in an effort to continue innovation in VSTs. The regulations also include guidelines for vehicle manufactures in order to ensure that the various VSTs work in many different environments. The NHTSA has a goal that these guidelines work with state and federal policies to create uniform regulation across the US.

== Preventative technologies for driver drowsiness ==
To prevent or account for drowsiness while driving, many companies have researched technologies to either detect drowsiness and protect the driver or keep the driver awake. One technology that aims to keep drivers awake is blue light. Blue light strains the eyes, making it difficult to fall asleep while driving, and it may be contained in all interior lights, touchscreens, clocks, and lights illuminating the speedometer and gas meter. Another preventative technology, designed to detect drowsiness, works by using data from lane departure sensors to identify jerky movements or swerving in and out of lanes. Once received, a coffee symbol on the dashboard will illuminate or a verbal response will sound to alert the driver that they should take a break. The driver's seat can also vibrate to startle them in the hopes that they become more alert. Both of these technologies are not yet perfect and are often faulty in detecting drowsiness. Other technologies are also being developed, including the flashing of bright lights containing blue light to keep drivers awake, along with steering technology that can correct for driver error while swerving due to drowsiness. Other technology seeks to prevent accidents from occurring by analyzing driver behavior. Companies such as SafeMode operate by analyzing driver behavior for "safety events", such as hard accelerations or breaking. If a driver decreases the number of times they record a safety event month after month, they earn incentives, ultimately making the road safer for all drivers.

== Electronic stability control (ESC) ==
Electronic stability control (also known as roll over protection) is a specific technology that helps keep the vehicle balanced. During harsh weather or tough road conditions that would cause vehicle steering to be extreme, this technology allows the drivers to regain control and prevent possible crashes, roll overs, and fishtails. This is the system which allows drivers to exit hydroplanes safely. In combination with automatic emergency braking technologies (see below), ESC controls each wheel individually to allow the driver to steer in the intended direction. To do this, ESC technologies apply singular breaks to all the wheels individually, slowing each one to the intended speed of the rest. Electronic stability control does not give traction to the vehicle; rather, it provides balance and momentary steering control.

== Automatic and emergency braking ==
There are four different and diverse automatic and emergency braking technologies. They include Automatic Emergency Braking (AEB), Crash Imminent Braking, Dynamic Brake Support, and Pedestrian Emergency Braking. These collision avoidance technologies detect vehicles in front of the car and automatically brake if a crash is detected. Before making any decisions on their own, AEB systems alert the driver of the suspected crash and allow a chance for the driver to take action. If the driver does not acknowledge the alert, AEB technology will then apply the brakes in hopes of avoiding or lessening the severity of a crash. Dynamic brake support is a technology which supplements the driver's brake if it is not hard enough already. As for crash imminent braking, this system automatically applies the brakes to avoid a crash. Drivers do not need to apply the brakes for the crash imminent system to engage. Pedestrian emergency braking systems sense pedestrians in front or near the car and will apply the brakes if drivers make no move to do so. This technology uses the front facing radar sensors and cameras to detect pedestrians, then apply the brakes in hopes of avoiding a collision. These systems have been available on a wide range of vehicles since 2006. Due to their growth in popularity, prices to add these systems to new vehicles have dropped and they are inexpensive to install. However they are quite pricey to fix due to the resolution and grade of cameras and sensors.

== Blind spot monitoring ==
The vehicle blind spot is an area outside the vehicle which cannot be seen by the driver from the driver's seat. Each person will have a different blind spot, and cannot see other cars within that area. To reduce the occurrence of crashes related to blind spots, numerous companies have developed technologies that alert drivers to other cars near their vehicle. These technologies also have the ability to detect which side other vehicles are approaching from. Vehicles with blind spot monitoring employ radar sensors and cameras positioned all around the exterior which warn drivers of the movement and presence of other vehicles in their surroundings. To alert the driver, blind spot monitoring systems will use one or more of warning sounds, seat vibration, and illuminated warning symbols, usually located on the outside of the vehicle's side mirrors on the side where a vehicle is present. Noises may also sound if the driver engages the turn signal when there is a vehicle in the blind spot area. Blind spot monitoring technologies are equipped on most luxury vehicles and in recently produced vehicles. There are packages present to add blind spot monitoring to vehicles at the time of purchase. One inherent weakness of many of these systems is that they struggle to detect fast moving cars, motorcycles, or low riding cars.

== Lane departure warnings ==
Lane departure warning systems are technologies that employ underside and wheel well cameras to detect when a wheel has unintentionally crossed a lane line without a turn signal. These systems were created in order to prevent lane swerving and possible driver drowsiness accidents. To alert the driver of a lane departure, systems can do employ one or more of a seat vibration, the illumination of a warning signal, and warning sounds (either a small sound or a verbal warning from system technologies. These systems do not alert the driver of a lane departure if a turn signal is used. These systems intend to prevent crashes and drowsiness by reducing the number of times a lane switch occurs without the use of a turn signal. Lane departure systems can be disabled so that no alert will occur, but it is recommended that a dealer make this change to prevent damage to the system.

== Speed monitoring and warning systems ==
Speed warning systems are designed to alert the driver of the vehicle when they have exceeded the speed limit. To do this, GPS technologies are used to triangulate the vehicle's location; along with a record of speed limits in the area, the system uses built-in speed sensors to notify the driver when they exceed the speed limit. If the list of speed limits is updated, it can also track school and work zone speed limit changes that would otherwise go unnoticed by the driver. When a driver exceeds the speed limit, any of the following can occur: a small ding will sound, the speed reading will turn red if the odometer is digital, an icon will light up and a ding will sound, or the vehicle will give a verbal response alerting the driver of their speed and to slow down. One speed monitoring technology which is undergoing testing in the US and Europe is called intelligent speed adaptation, which would assess the speed of the vehicle, and with the permission from the driver, automatically slow the vehicle down to the proper legal speed. If implemented, though, drivers would be able to override this system or turn it off entirely. However, these technologies keep drivers safe from distractions which would otherwise result in a speeding ticket or a car accident.

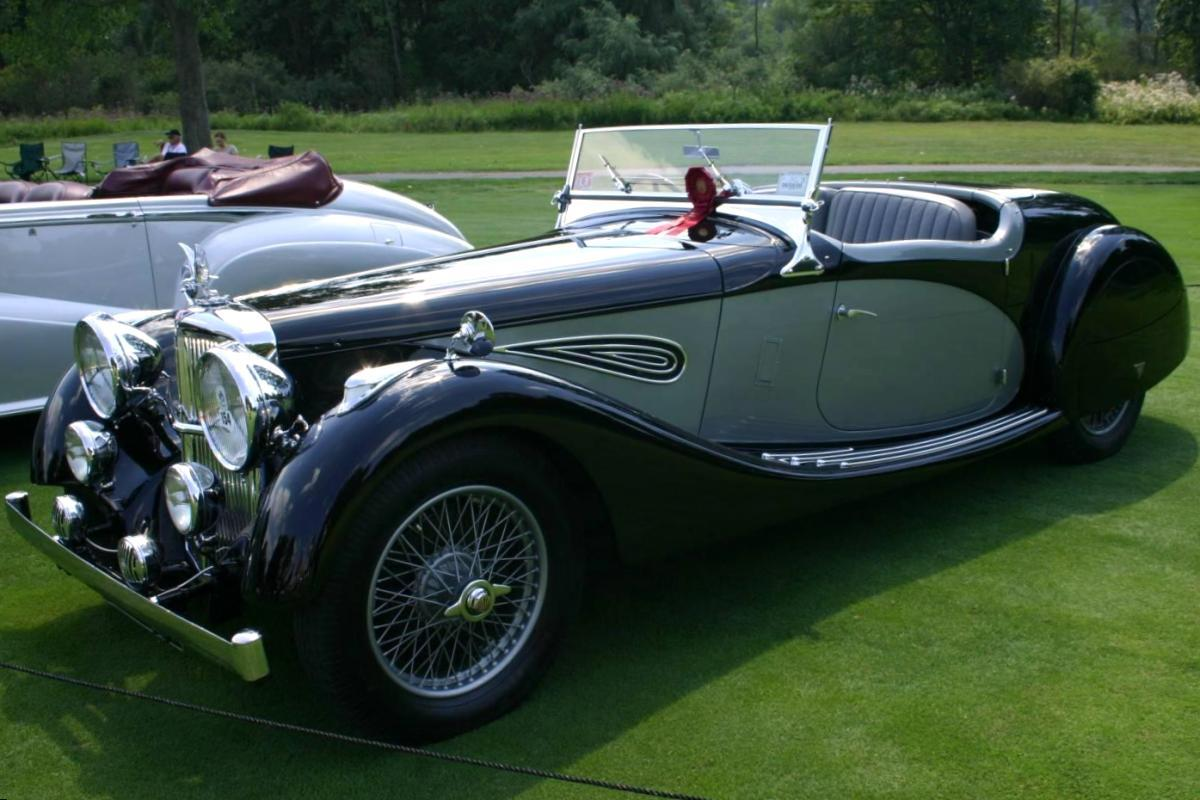
What some of the first automobiles looked like

== Future technologies ==
In addition to those currently available, many technologies are being created which will one day be integrated into our vehicles. One future example of VST is vehicle-to-vehicle communication, which would allow vehicles on busy highways, interstates, and even small country roads to wirelessly communicate. Communication between vehicles would involve the sharing of speed data and positioning of other vehicles with all cars on the road, creating a 360 degree awareness for each driver. Vehicle-to-vehicle communication is being developed in hopes that it will prevent more crashes and ease traffic congestion. Unfortunately the many potential benefits of vehicle-to-vehicle communication can only be achieved when all vehicles can communicate with one another.

Another technology in design is vehicle cyber security. Due to the many electronics installed in cars today, cyber theft is a bigger threat than it has ever been before; without proper security over vehicles' electronics, thieves can access GPS locations and locations to which the vehicle has recently traveled. If the driver connects their phone over Bluetooth, this information can also be stolen when the phone is actively connected to the vehicle. Many electric vehicle systems that control the car can also be hacked. If this occurs, the hacker can then control the vehicle, putting the safety and privacy of the driver and passengers in jeopardy. Many devices are being designed to help protect drivers' private information along with the safety of their vehicle technology, and the NHTSA is working closely with engineers to develop this future technology. Additional preventative technologies for driver drowsiness are also being designed, which could involve cameras monitoring drivers' eye movement. These systems would aim to determine when drivers are getting drowsy based on a lack of eye movement.
