= Frontal protection system =

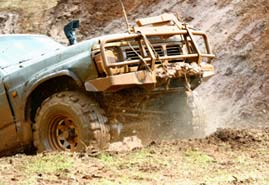
Old style bull bar (This is actually a winch bumper, and was not affected by the legislation regarding FPS)

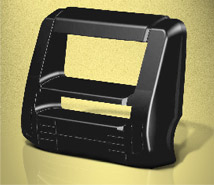
New, pedestrian-friendly Frontal Protection System

A frontal protection system (FPS) is a device fitted to the front end of a vehicle to protect both pedestrians and cyclists who are involved in the unfortunate event of a front-end collision with a vehicle.

After public concerns about the safety of bull bars led to governmental pressure on SUV and 4x4 vehicle manufacturers, the Transport Research Laboratory developed a series of tests designed to ensure that minimum safety standards are met on vehicles fitted with them. This test has now become embodied within European Directive 2005/66/EC, coming into force in May 2007.

Effectively outlawing traditional metal fabricated bull bars, the new legislation has led to the development of more pedestrian-friendly products. Various manufacturers have undertaken development using softer, energy absorbing materials. However the overhead of testing has prevented a number of designs from coming to market.

== Operation ==
An FPS attaches to the front of a vehicle like a bull bar, but is made of a technical composite of energy-absorbing materials. The composite technology offers an interim solution to vehicle designers, assisting them to meet EC Directive 2003/102/EC Phase 2.

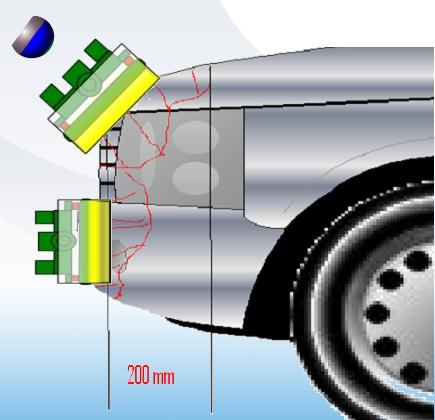
Intrusion into base vehicle without an FPS: 200mm

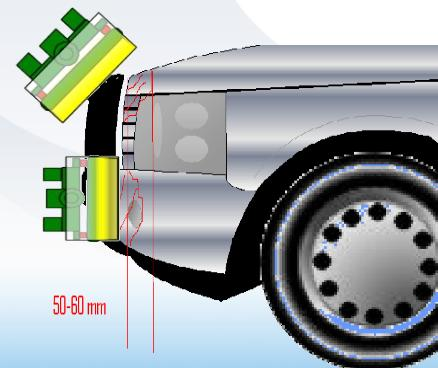
Intrusion into base vehicle with an FPS: 50-60mm

Testing in 2001 showed that steel bull bars could lead to greater risk of injury. Later studies carried out by MIRA, one of the UK's leading testing-facilities, may have proved that the latest development of a vehicle Frontal Protection System can make some 4x4 vehicles safer in the event of front-end collisions with pedestrians or cyclists. Calculations based on these tests show that if fitted to a current large 4x4 vehicle, an FPS could save lives and reduce serious pedestrian-injuries.

This legislation amounts to a de facto ban on Frontal Protection Systems, due to the high cost of compliance and type testing, and the sheer complexity of the law. The type testing procedure can be seen here.

At least one small manufacturer of FPS has ceased production in the UK due to the costs of testing exceeding £100,000 per design. They now sell winch bumpers made from solid steel instead, which are not banned. The company behind the push for the change in the law, Concept Mouldings Ltd, ironically went bankrupt due to these high costs of testing.

Directive 2005/66/EC was repealed effective 24 November 2009.

== See also ==
- Pedestrian safety through vehicle design
- Automobile safety
- Roadkill
- Off-roading
- Automotive aftermarket
