= ISeeCars.com =

American online car search website

iSeeCars
- Type: Private
- Industry: Internet; Automotive
- Founded: October 23, 2013; 12 years ago
- Founders: Phong Ly; Vineet Manohar
- Headquarters: Woburn, Massachusetts, U.S.
- Key people: Phong Ly CEO, Vineet Manohar CTO
- Website: iseecars.com

iSeeCars.com is an online automotive search engine and research website which helps users find and compare cars for sale using a proprietary computer algorithm.

== Business ==
iSeeCars analyzes used car listings for a number of factors including reasonableness of the price, fairness of the dealer and positive and negative attributes of the vehicle. iSeeCars.com also provides car buying tips and reviews through articles written by automotive experts. The site also conducts research studies about car trends and consumer purchasing behavior. iSeeCars.com has been featured in ABC News, USA Today, CNBC, Consumer Reports, and Wall Street Journal.

== History ==
iSeeCars.com was co-founded by Vineet Manohar, former software engineer at TripAdvisor and a graduate of Indian Institute of Technology, and Phong Ly, previously a marketer at SAP and a graduate of Harvard Business School. iSeeCars.com was officially launched to the public in 2013. iSeeCars.com is privately owned and headquartered in Woburn, MA.

iSeeCars.com partners with a number of automotive websites and car dealerships, including eBay, to aggregate millions of car listings for users to search. In 2012, iSeeCars.com participated in a case study with Chrome Data, a subsidiary of Internet Brands, about the integration of vehicle specifications to help users research and compare vehicles.

In May 2014 and 2015, iSeeCars.com was named a finalist in the MITX What's Next Awards for "Best Consumer Tech that Makes Life Easier". In May 2015, iSeeCars.com was also selected as a Webby Awards Honoree in the Web / Car Sites & Culture category.

== Research ==
iSeeCars.com's researchers use their database of more than 30 million car listings to better understand car trends and consumer behavior. Some of the studies conducted by iSeeCars.com included "10 cars most likely to go 200,000 miles" for Consumer Reports, "Tesla cars are worth more used than new" for CNBC, "Men like minivans and hybrids as much as women do" for CBS News, and "Where To Find The Best (And Worst) Used-Car Deals" for Forbes. In February 2014, iSeeCars.com's study that used Tesla cars were selling for more than new ones was cited by Tesla Motors CEO, Elon Musk.
