= Car colour popularity =

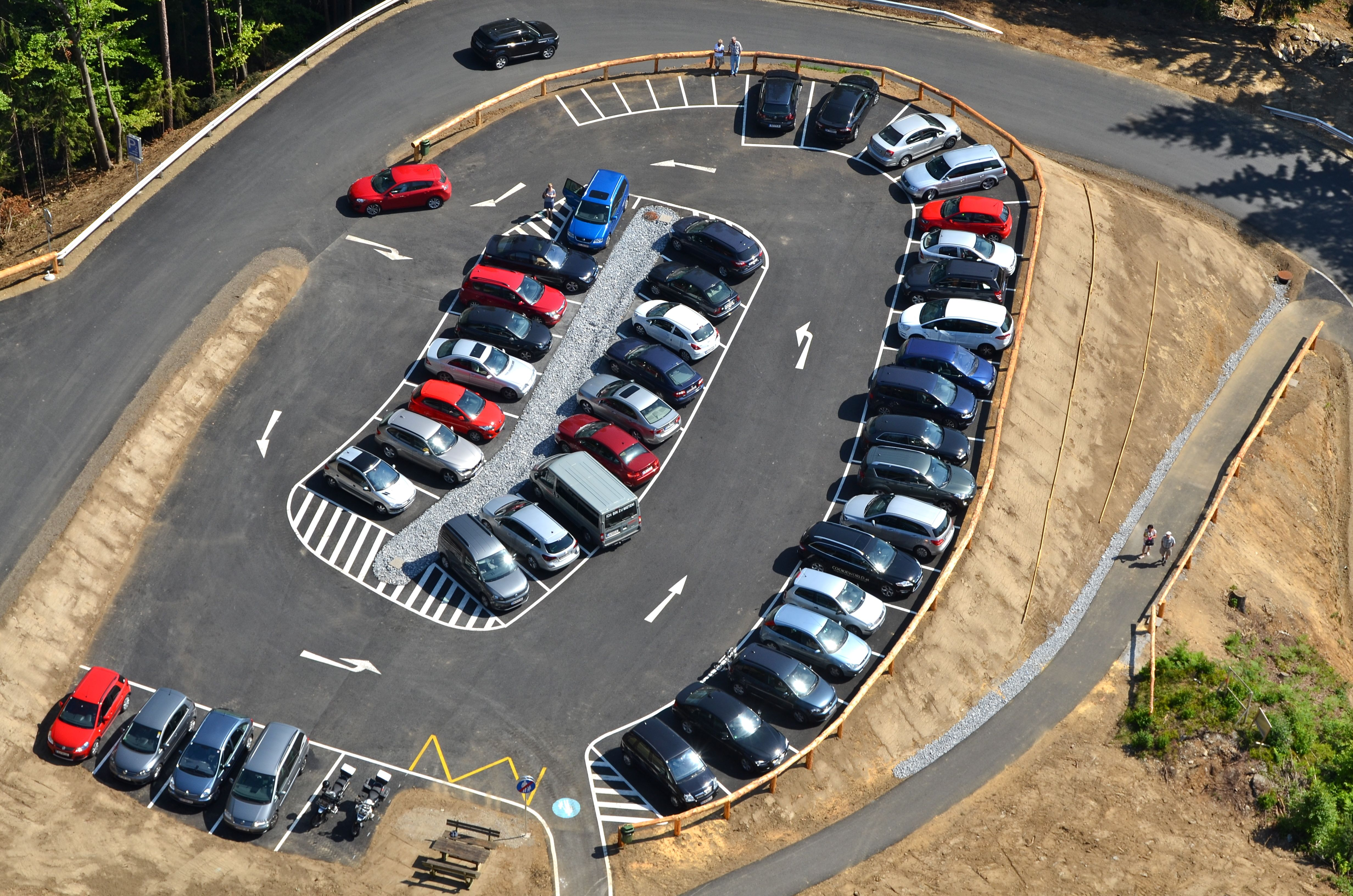
A carpark in Austria, 2013

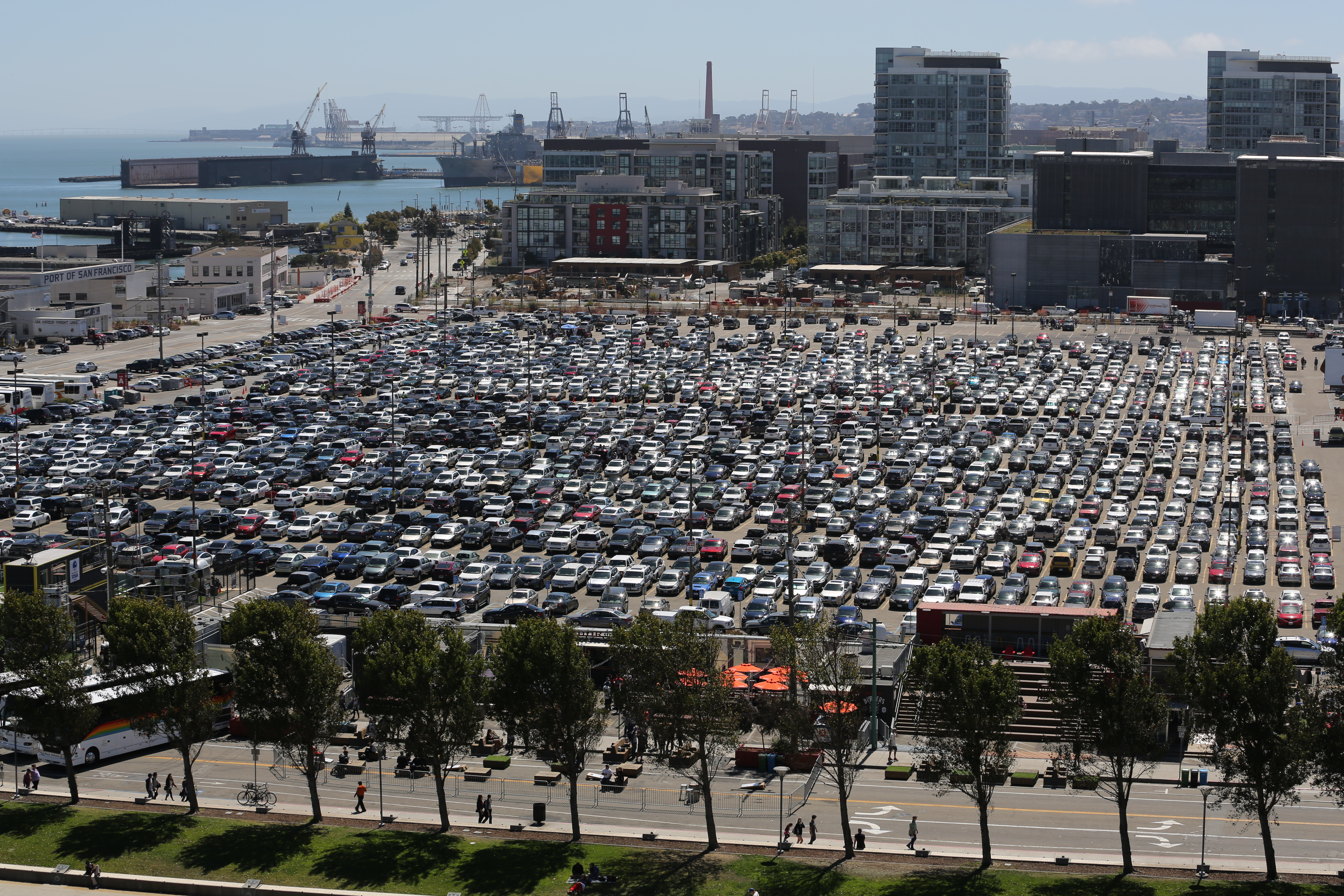
Parking lot in California, 2016

The most popular car colours as of 2024 were greyscale colours, with 80% of cars produced being white, black, grey or silver. Red, blue, and green cars ranged between 2% and 9% each, while all other colours amounted to less than 2%.

== Survey results (2024) ==
In 2024, online automotive search engine iSeeCars.com published a study measuring the colours of cars sold between January 2023 and April 2024. The results of the study are shown in the chart below.

Colour distribution (%)
| Colour | Overall | Trucks | SUVs | Passenger cars | Sports cars |
|---|---|---|---|---|---|
| White | 24.8 | 30.9 | 26.7 | 24.8 | 19.4 |
| Black | 22.0 | 20.0 | 23.1 | 21.6 | 19.4 |
| Grey | 21.3 | 20.6 | 21.1 | 22.7 | 20.1 |
| Silver | 9.1 | 7.9 | 9.2 | 9.4 | 3.5 |
| Blue | 8.9 | 9.6 | 8.5 | 9.9 | 13.2 |
| Red | 7.3 | 7.2 | 7.1 | 8.2 | 14.3 |
| Green | 2.0 | 1.7 | 2.5 | 1.2 | 3.4 |
| Others | 1.8 | 2.1 | 1.7 | 2.1 | 3.3 |

== Survey results (2012) ==
The results of colour popularity surveys conducted by American paint manufacturers PPG Industries (PPG) and DuPont (DP) (both for the year 2012) are shown in the table and chart below. Note that the results for silver and grey may be affected by discrepancies in how the companies classify these colours.

Colour distribution (%)
| Colour | North America | | Europe | | Asia-Pacific | | World | |
| Colour | PPG | DP | PPG | DP | PPG | DP | PPG | DP |
|---|---|---|---|---|---|---|---|---|
| White | 21 | 24 | 23 | 24 | 23 | 22 | 22 | 23 |
| Silver | 16 | 16 | 13 | 14 | 23 | 14 | 20 | 18 |
| Black | 19 | 19 | 21 | 23 | 19 | 21 | 19 | 21 |
| Grey | 16 | 15 | 17 | 15 | 8 | 20 | 12 | 14 |
| Blue | 8 | 7 | 7 | 8 | 7 | 5 | 7 | 6 |
| Red | 10 | 10 | 7 | 6 | 9 | 7 | 9 | 8 |
| Brown | 7 | 5 | 7 | 6 | 10 | 6 | 7 | 6 |
| Green | 3 | 2 | 2 | 1 | 1 | 1 | 2 | 1 |
| Others | | 2 | 3 | 3 | | 4 | 1 | 3 |

Colour popularity

== Financial impacts of colour choice ==
Silver is a popular colour for rental vehicles. Cars that are silver retain their value better than any other colour, reselling for around 10% more than white cars; this superior resale value has caused many UK police agencies to replace their standard white patrol cars with silver models.

A common misconception is that red cars cost more to insure; in fact, insurers do not take colour into account.

Studies show that white cars are safer, getting in 12% fewer collisions than black cars, although some studies show yellow cars as being slightly safer than white. This is a major reason why school buses are yellow in much of the world. The safety difference is because lighter coloured cars are easier for other drivers to see, especially at night. However, other factors, such as driver behaviour and weather, are significantly more important to vehicle safety.

== Historical trends ==
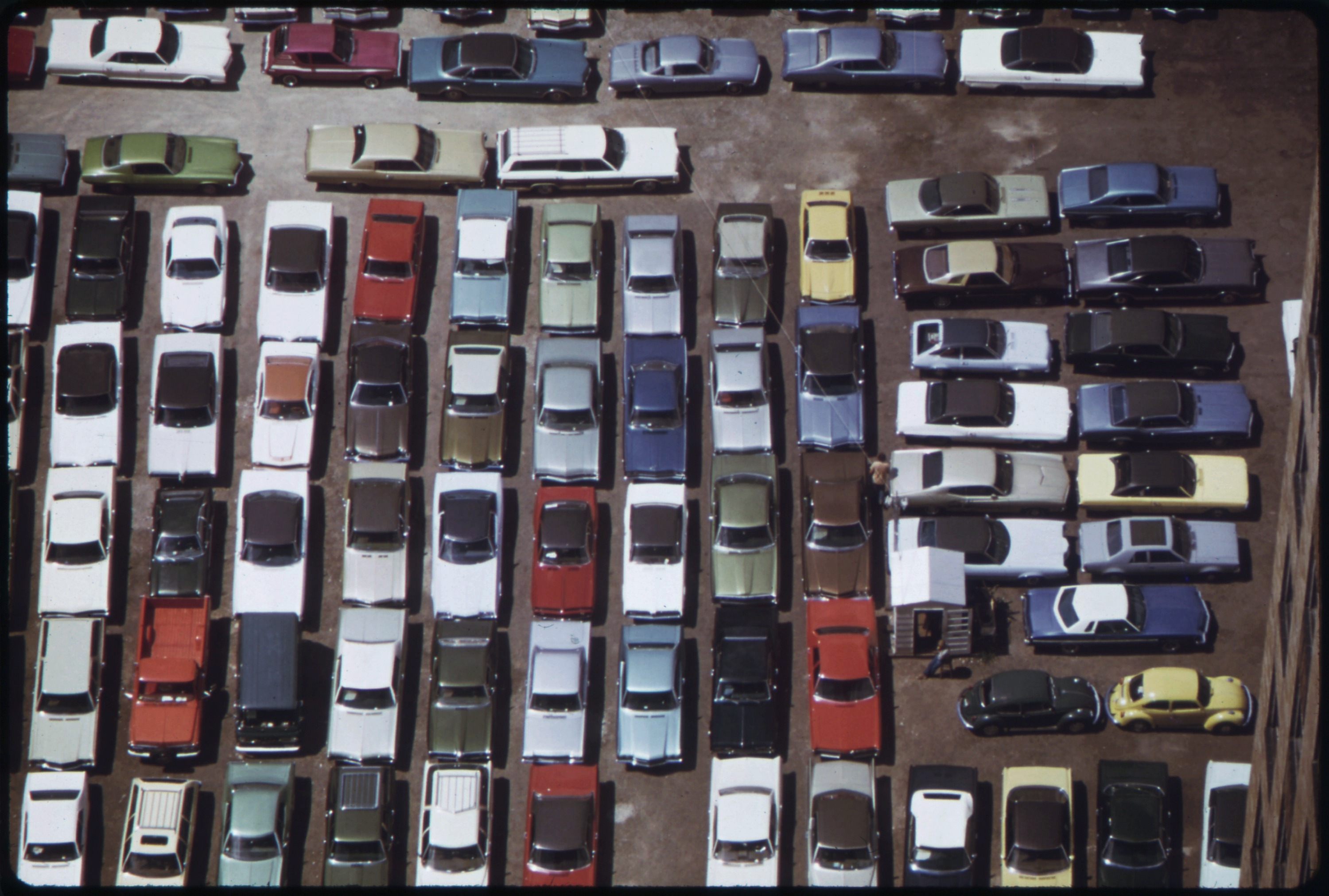
More colour variety in 1973, America

Colour choice is subject to fluctuation and fashion, and historical trends shifted from dark neutral colours of early cars, through more vivid colours of 1950s and 1960s, back towards today's greyscale colours.

== Gender differences ==
A 2013 survey in the United States found that men were 12% more likely to prefer a red car, while women were 9% more likely to prefer silver. The research suggested this may indicate that women are more likely to prefer practical cars, while men may be more likely to prefer less practical but more fast and fun cars.

== See also ==
- Metallic paint
