= Footwell intrusion =

In the field of automotive engineering, footwell intrusion describes a situation in which an automobile engine or other vehicle component penetrates the space normally allocated for the feet of the front seat occupants. Automotive crash testing agencies such as Euro NCAP and IIHS consider levels of footwell intrusion when conducting assessments. Vehicles that display excessive deformation of the footwell are noted.

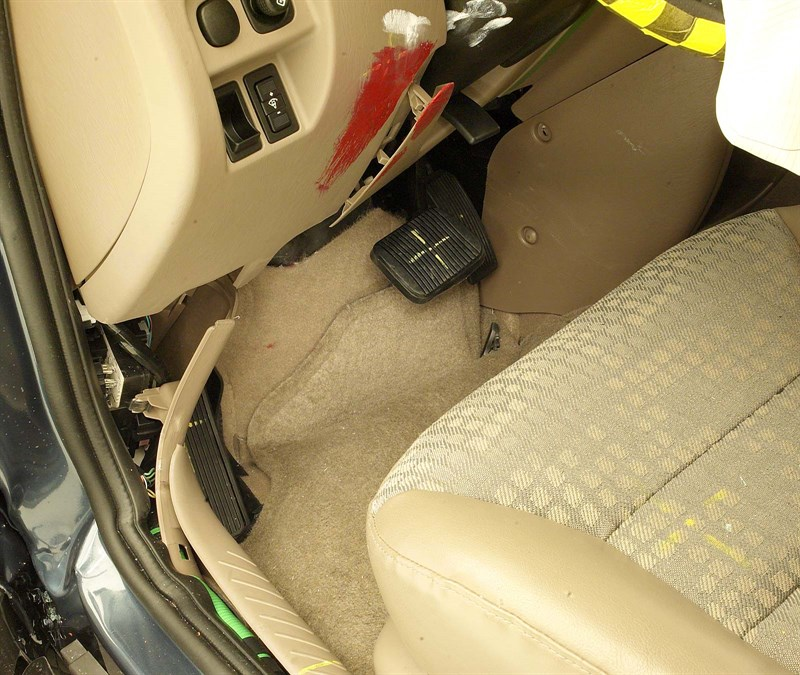
Aftermath of NHTSA crash test of a 2004 Ford Escape showing healthy footwell intrusion.

More of the physical property is conducive to greater crash injuries to driver's and passengers' lower legs and feet. The interaction between feet, pedals and (on crash) invading vehicle parts is directly linked with damage to the ankles, tibia and adjoining cartilage.
