= Automobile safety rating =

Grade given by a testing organisation indicating vehicle safety

An automobile safety rating is a grade given by a testing organisation to a motor vehicle indicating the safety of occupants in the event of a motor vehicle crash, like with the New Car Assessment Program.

== Australia ==
In Australia, vehicle safety ratings are provided by ANCAP whose procedures are similar to Euro NCAP.

ANCAP took in 1999 some part of Euro NCAP procedures.

In 2018, ANCAP adopted the Euro NCAP protocols, with the scoring tweaked to the local conditions.

== Europe ==
In Europe, vehicle safety ratings are provided by Euro NCAP.

Euro NCAP provides motoring consumers with a realistic and independent assessment of the safety performance of some of the most popular cars sold in Europe.

Established in 1997 and now backed by seven European governments, the European Commission and motoring and consumer organisations in every EU country, Euro NCAP has rapidly become a catalyst for encouraging significant safety improvements to new car design.

== Global ==
In the world, there are nine New Car Assessment Programs.

Eight out of the nine test programs makes their vehicle safety ratings with a count of stars included in the range (1 to 5 stars). One test program, IIHS, makes a four level rating: Good, Acceptable, Marginal and Poor.

The differences between those various test programs include the range of tests and test configurations, the final rating computation, and the specification of models available in different markets.

== Latin America ==
Since 2010, Latin NCAP has been rating new cars for Latin America and the Caribbean with procedures similar to the ones used by Euro NCAP.

Latin NCAP results cannot be compared to Euro NCAP results: Euro NCAP has 5 ratings: Frontal off-set, side, pole, whiplash and pedestrian tests, while Latin NCAP has 2: frontal off-set crash test and side impact test. Latin NCAP 2020-2022 is similar to Euro NCAP 2014.

The frontal crash test of Latin NCAP is similar to the frontal crash test of Euro NCAP.

== United States ==
In the U.S., a New Car Assessment Program (NCAP) which provides vehicle safety ratings is run by the National Highway Traffic Safety Administration.
