= Claire L. Straith =

American plastic surgeon

- Born: 1891
- Died: 1958 (aged 66–67)
- Occupation: plastic surgeon

Claire L. Straith (1891–1958) was an American plastic surgeon. Straith, a pioneer of automobile safety, was called the "first hero of the auto safety movement".

Straith described the cranial and facial injuries created by the dashboards and windshields and advocated the redesign of interiors to mitigate the injuries caused by hook-shaped door handles, unpadded dashboards and protruding knobs and sharp edges on dashboards. He advocated the use of seat belts in case of a car crash and padded dashboards

According to Joel W. Eastman, author of Styling Vs. Safety: The American Automobile Industry and the Development of Automotive Safety 1900-1966,

Claire Straith was the first hero of the auto safety movement. He was the first to recognize that it was automobiles that injured people. An accident was just the event, but it was the collision between the passengers and the inside of the car that caused the injuries.

Straith gained the attention of Walter P. Chrysler, and the knobs and handles of the 1937 Dodge were designed for safety based upon Straith's recommendations. Some of Straith's ideas were to be incorporated into the 1948 Tucker Sedan. The safety packages did not sell as well as the companies hoped; decades later regulatory reforms made the safety features mandatory.
