= Safe Driving Day =

Accident prevention initiative in USA

Safe Driving Day, or S-D Day was a US holiday introduced in 1954 "to focus national attention on the traffic accident problem". The effort was kicked off by President Eisenhower in a November 16, 1954 statement in which he called on Americans to "help make it a day without a single traffic accident throughout our entire country." Eisenhower went on to outline a three-point plan to achieve this goal:

1. Obey traffic regulations.
2. Follow common sense rules of good sportsmanship and courtesy.
3. Stay alert and careful, mindful of the constant possibility of accidents caused by negligence.

The second Safe Driving Day was on December 1, 1955.
