= Cargo barrier =

Type of safety partition for vehicles

A cargo barrier is a vehicle accessory installed into motor vehicles to aid occupancy safety when carrying loads or domestic pets, (usually dogs) in the rear section of a vehicle. Other terms used for cargo barriers include: dog guard, mesh partition, load separator, pet barrier, and mesh grille.

A cargo barrier can take many shapes and forms, but generally is of metal construction, fabricated or assembled with bars of mesh. The main purpose is to act as a barrier between the boot / trunk area and passenger area of various types of vehicle including; car, 4X4, MPV, SUV and commercial vehicles. It acts a method of restraining an animal or loads from entering into the passenger area either in normal use, or more importantly in the event of vehicle collision.

A cargo barrier acts in many applications including; taxis, luggage / loads, fleet vehicle equipment transport, camping or where a requirement exists to maximise the full load area of the vehicle boot / trunk. This allows the cargo to be loaded higher than the height of the top of the seats, whilst providing an effective barrier between loads and the vehicle occupants.

They are available in either Universal or Custom Fit specific to the vehicle. An advantage of the Universal cargo barrier is that it can be located in multiple vehicles without the need for modification. However, because of the increasing fitment of passenger car airbags and side protection systems, the custom fit barriers are becoming increasingly favoured to ensure a greater level of rigidity, safety and security. The world's largest producer of custom barriers are Travall; a UK-based company designing and manufacturing vehicle-specific barriers for over 400 different models.

A good quality cargo barrier should consist of rigid fabricated steel frame with welded mesh insert, tough coated finish (i.e. Nylon Powder coating), supports mounted to the vehicle C Posts or the vehicle frame (to transfer any impacted load onto the vehicle chassis rather than rear seats) and easy fitment and removal. Universal barriers generally are a poorer fit and install, are cheaper and allow for multi-vehicle installation. Whereas tailored / custom cargo barriers are generally of a much higher build quality, are more rigidly installed, and provide better long term security.

While they are not designed as rollbars, cargo barriers can also help prevent the collapse of a vehicle roof in vehicle rollovers.

== Installation ==
Some cargo barriers are designed to be mounted in more than one position inside a vehicle, such as behind the front row of seats and behind the rear seats. This enables rear seats to be folded to increase cargo space, whilst still providing driver/passenger protection. Such cargo barriers may require installation of mounting accessories in more than one location within the vehicle.

As the cargo compartment of a vehicle often cannot be opened from within, installation of a cargo barrier may become an entrapment hazard for children or adults. In some cases, a removable plastic window in the barrier is sometimes provided to enable access to the passenger compartment. In other cases, an escape hammer is sometimes provided to allow escape by breaking a rear window.

Some vehicle manufacturers provide mounting points in some of their vehicles designed to accept cargo barriers. In other cases, for reasons of safety, rather than utilizing mounting points designed for child restraints and other purposes, many cargo barriers require specialized mounting brackets, sockets, rust preventatives and trim accessories to be fitted to the vehicle. In these cases, manufacturers may recommend that installation is performed by a trained fitter, as high technical competence is required to correctly install such mounting equipment. A trained fitter may require a few hours to perform such an installation.

Some cargo barriers are designed to be able to be relocated or removed by the user, after the mounting equipment is fitted to a vehicle. They may be fitted with a quick release mechanism enabling this to be done in a few minutes.

== Manufacturers ==
Australian manufacturers include Milford Industries, Hayman Reese and Ausguard. European brands include; Athag, Barjo, Guardsman, Kleinmetall, Saunders and Travall amongst others.

Canadian manufacturers include: IMC Cargo Barriers

These are becoming more commonly available by the vehicle manufacturers accessory programme (OEM / OES), but generally throughout the EU, are not heavily supported. This has resulted in consumers more commonly purchasing from the aftermarket via online retailers or retail outlets.
