= Independent Safety Board Act of 1974 =

The Independent Safety Board Act (Pub. L. 93−633) is a 1974 law that ended all ties between the National Transportation Safety Board and the U.S. Department of Transportation. It was created to avoid possible conflicts between agencies.

== Background ==
The National Transportation Safety Board originated in the Air Commerce Act of 1926. From that year onwards, Congress required civil aviation accident investigations to be conducted under that law. In 1967, Congress merged the transportation agencies into the U.S. Department of Transportation and established the NTSB as an independent agency within DOT for administrative support. The NTSB is chiefly known for its oversight in aviation accident investigations. From 1926 onwards, Congress required the investigations of civil aviation accidents under the Air Commerce Act (Pub. L. 69-254, 44 Stat. 568). Later on, Congress created other laws as well, which created the Civil Aeronautics Board and the Federal Aviation Agency, in which the latter became the Federal Aviation Administration. The Federal Aviation Act of 1958, which created the Federal Aviation Administration, gave the Civil Aeronautics Board duties investigating civil aviation accidents.

In 1974, as the airline industry rapidly expanded, Congress established the NTSB within the framework of the Department of Transportation, as outlined in the Department of Transportation Act of 1966. This legislation bestowed upon the NTSB responsibilities previously held by the Civil Aeronautics Board. However, as the NTSB began conducting investigations into the Federal Aviation Administration (FAA), conflicts of interest emerged. Consequently, Congress enacted the Independent Safety Board Act to mitigate such conflicts and ensure the NTSB's autonomy.

The Act also prohibits the use of any portion of an NTSB report as evidence in a lawsuit related to matters discussed in the report and, with few restrictive exceptions, bars discovery, admittance into evidence, and public release of transcripts or recordings of a "cockpit or surface vehicle...voice or video recorder" if not made public by the NTSB.
