= Pedestrian crash avoidance mitigation =

System that recognizes pedestrians and bicycles in an automobile's path

Pedestrian crash avoidance mitigation (PCAM) systems (USDOT Volpe Center), also known as pedestrian protection or detection systems, use computer and artificial intelligence technology to recognize pedestrians and bicycles in an automobile's path to take action for safety. PCAM systems are often part of a pre-collision system available in several high end car manufacturers, such as Volvo and Mercedes and Lexus, and used less widely in lower end cars such as Ford and Nissan. As of 2018 using 2016 data, more than 6,000 pedestrians and 800 cyclists are killed every year in the US in car crashes. Effective systems deployed widely could save up to 50% of these lives. More than 270,000 pedestrians are killed every year in the world. An excellent analysis of technology capabilities and limitations is provided in Death of Elaine Herzberg. Pedestrian safety has traditionally taken a secondary role to passenger safety.

== Availability ==
Typically, PCAM systems are part of the technology in self-driving cars and use an integrated forward-facing camera and radar or lidar system designed to help mitigate or avoid a frontal crash. However, PCAM technologies do not require self-driving technologies, just cameras and radar. Sometimes, these can be enhanced with the addition of low-light detection for pedestrians and bicycles. In 2016, the U.S. Department of Transportation's National Highway Traffic Safety Administration officially announced that automakers in the U.S. have to include the autonomous emergency braking system as a standard feature for all cars and trucks by 2022: this is a key component of PCAM. A detailed explanation for manufacturers offering emergency braking as part of a pre-collision system and often PCAM is provided as part of a broader collision avoidance system.

== Functions ==
Under certain conditions, if the PCAM systems determine that the possibility of a frontal crash with a pedestrian or bicyclist is high, it prompts the driver to take evasive action and brake by using an audio and visual alert. If the driver notices the hazard and brakes, the system may use some sort of brake assist to provide additional braking force.

If the driver does not brake in a set time and the PCAM determine that the risk of collision with a pedestrian or bicycle is extremely high, the system may automatically apply the brakes, reducing speed to help mitigate the impact or avoid the collision entirely if possible. Usually, this is a setting the driver must make to initiate earlier, but it can be the default.

== Technology ==
In order to recognize a pedestrian, the computational system uses AI pattern recognition technology that typically uses machine learning and deep convolutional neural networks based on millions of images. In a simplified description, images from the car's camera and radar are compared to the prototypes stored in the computer. If a match is made and confirmed, the other systems in the PCAM are invoked. PCAM technologies can be improved with additional information from connected vehicles. A thorough description of the processes for pedestrian detection in about 2010 is provided in . AI technologies have improved dramatically since then, as can be seen in an update in May 2016.

== PCAM systems as part of ADAS ==
PCAM extend the pedestrian safety systems achieved through pedestrian safety through vehicle design with automated ADAS. Volvo had the first automated braking system focused on other cars, but including pedestrians in 2009. The Insurance Institute for Highway Safety (IIHS) has published the results of their tests for pre-collision automated ADAS and determined a 50% improvement with automated braking. They did not provide separate information for pedestrian safety. HLDI, a part of IIHS, provides some evaluations of most of the main pre-collision ADAS. They found that Subaru's Eyesight I PCAM cut insurance claims by 31% and its version II, by 40%.
