= Automated emergency braking system =

Vehicle safety technology

Schematic of an advanced emergency braking system

The World Forum for Harmonization of Vehicle Regulations define AEBS (also automated emergency braking in some jurisdictions). UN ECE regulation 131 requires a system which can automatically detect a potential forward collision and activate the vehicle braking system to decelerate a vehicle with the purpose of avoiding or mitigating a collision. UN ECE regulation 152 says deceleration has to be at least 5 m/s².

Once an impending collision is detected, these systems provide a warning to the driver. When the collision becomes imminent, they can take action autonomously without any driver input (by braking or steering or both). Collision avoidance by braking is appropriate at low vehicle speeds (e.g. below 50 km/h (31 mph)), while collision avoidance by steering may be more appropriate at higher vehicle speeds if lanes are clear. Cars with collision avoidance may also be equipped with adaptive cruise control, using the same forward-looking sensors.

AEB differs from forward collision warning: FCW alerts the driver with a warning but does not by itself brake the vehicle.

According to Euro NCAP, AEB has three characteristics:

- Autonomous: the system acts independently of the driver to avoid or mitigate the accident.
- Emergency: the system will intervene only in a critical situation.
- Braking: the system tries to avoid the accident by applying the brakes.

Time-to-collision could be a way to choose which avoidance method (braking or steering) is most appropriate.

A collision avoidance system by steering is a new concept. It is considered by some research projects. Collision avoidance system by steering has some limitations: over-dependence on lane markings, sensor limitations, and interaction between driver and system.

== History ==
=== Early approaches and forward collision avoidance system ===
Early warning systems were attempted as early as the late 1950s. An example is Cadillac, which developed a prototype vehicle named the Cadillac Cyclone which used the new radar technology to detect objects in front of the car with the radar sensors mounted inside "nose cones". It was deemed too costly to manufacture.

The first modern forward collision avoidance system was patented in 1990 by William L. Kelley.

The second modern forward collision avoidance system was demonstrated in 1995 by a team of scientists and engineers at Hughes Research Laboratories (HRL) in Malibu, California. The project was funded by Delco Electronics and was led by HRL physicist Ross D. Olney. The technology was marketed as Forewarn. The system was radar-based – a technology that was readily available at Hughes Electronics, but not commercially elsewhere. A small custom fabricated radar antenna was developed specifically for this automotive application at 77 GHz.

The first production laser adaptive cruise control on a Toyota vehicle was introduced on the Celsior model (Japan only) in August 1997.

=== Commercial and regulatory development ===
In 2008, AEB was introduced in the British market.

Between 2010 and 2014, Euro NCAP rewarded various constructors whose system had AEB features.

Euro NCAP rewards
Maker	Year	System
BMW	2014	BMW Pedestrian Warning with City Brake Activation
FIAT	2013	FIAT City Brake Control
Mitsubishi	2013	Mitsubishi Forward Collision Mitigation
Skoda	2013	Skoda Front Assistant
Audi	2012	Audi Pre Sense Front
Audi	2012	Audi Pre Sense Front Plus
VW	2012	Volkswagen Front Assist
Ford	2011	Ford Active City Stop
Ford	2011	Ford Forward Alert
Mercedes-Benz	2011	Mercedes-Benz Collision Prevention Assist
VW	2011	Volkswagen City Emergency Brake
Honda	2010	Honda Collision Mitigation Braking System™ (CMBS™)
Mercedes-Benz	2010	Mercedes-Benz PRE-SAFE® Brake
Volvo	2010	Volvo City Safety

In the early-2000s, the U.S. National Highway Traffic Safety Administration (NHTSA) studied whether to make frontal collision warning systems and lane departure warning systems mandatory. In 2011, the European Commission investigated the stimulation of "collision mitigation by braking" systems. Mandatory fitting (extra cost option) of Advanced Emergency Braking Systems in commercial vehicles was scheduled to be implemented on 1 November 2013 for new vehicle types and on 1 November 2015 for all new vehicles in the European Union. According to the "impact assessment", this could prevent around 5,000 fatalities and 50,000 serious injuries per year across the EU.

In March 2016, the National Highway Traffic Safety Administration (NHTSA) and the Insurance Institute for Highway Safety announced the manufacturers of 99% of U.S. automobiles had agreed to include automatic emergency braking systems as standard on virtually all new cars sold in the U.S. by 2022. In Europe, there was a related agreement about an AEBS or AEB in 2012. United Nations Economic Commission for Europe (UNECE) has announced that this kind of system will become mandatory for new heavy vehicles starting in 2015. AEBS is regulated by UNECE regulation 131. NHTSA projected that the ensuing accelerated rollout of automatic emergency braking would prevent an estimated 28,000 collisions and 12,000 injuries.

In 2016, 40% of US car model have AEB as an option.

As of January 2017, in the United Kingdom, an estimated 1,586,103 vehicles had AEB. This makes AEB available in 4.3% of the British vehicle fleet.

As of 2021, Consumer Reports shows a rise in automakers making city-speed AEB standard. In 2021, six automakers included AEB on all models, up from two in 2020, indicating increased customer demand for this safety feature.

Australia

AEB market shares in Australia (in percentage) View chart definition.
AEB shares in Australia (first 100 car models)

In April 2020 AEB is:

- standard on 66% of new light vehicle models (passenger cars, SUVs and light commercial vehicles) sold in Australia,
- 10% on higher grade variants only (AEB not available on base variant)
- 6% as option
- 16% have no form of AEB

United States

Since 2015, the NHTSA has recommended AEB for vehicles. As of 2021, it is not mandatory in the US vehicles. However, in 2016, the NHTSA convinced automobile manufacturers to include AEB in 99% of new cars car sold in the US by 1 September 2022.

On 9 June 2021, in Phoenix, USA, a heavy truck going too fast for traffic conditions crashed with seven other vehicles on a motorway, killing four people and hurting nine. Two days later, US National Transportation Safety Board, prepare a nine-person team to investigate this crash, and to assess whether automatic emergency braking in the truck would have helped to mitigate or prevent the crash.

	Percent of US vehicles with AEB produced 1 September 2017 to 31 August 2018 (2018 model year)	Percent of vehicles produced 1 Sep to 31 Aug with AEB (2019 model year)	Percent of vehicles produced 1 Sep to 31 Aug with AEB (2020 model year)	Percent of 2021 models with standard AEB (2021 model year)
	As reported by manufacturer for light-duty vehicles 3,850 kg (8,500 lb) or less gross vehicle weight	As reported by manufacturer for light-duty vehicles weighing 3,850 kg (8,500 lb) or less	As reported by manufacturer for light-duty vehicles weighing 3,850 kg (8,500 lb) or less	As compiled by Consumer Reports
Tesla	100	100	100	100
Mercedes-Benz	96	99	97	94
Volvo	93	100	100	100
Toyota/Lexus	90	92	97	100
Audi	87	99	99	83
Nissan/Infiniti	78	86	82	82
Volkswagen	69	92	98	89
Honda/Acura	61	86	94	86
Mazda	61	80	96	100
Subaru	57	84	99	57
BMW	49	84	99	94
Maserati/Alfa Romeo	27	48	48	33
General Motors	24	29	47	50
Hyundai/Genesis	18	78	96	93
Kia	13	59	75	50
Fiat Chrysler	10	10	14	20
Porsche	8	38	55	50
Ford/Lincoln	6	65	91	83
Mitsubishi	6	5	39	100
Jaguar Land Rover	0	0	0	100

In 2019, 66% of autobrake systems evaluate by the IIHS in 2019 models earn the highest rating of superior for front crash prevention.

Now, the technology is common across all makes and models as well as price classes. By an agreement between automakers and the National Highway Traffic Safety Administration (NHTSA), by September 1, 2022, nearly all new vehicles sold in the United States will have the technology as standard equipment.

— JD Power

Japan

In 2017, AEB is one of the most popular forms of ADAS in Japan, in Japan more than 40% of newly manufactured vehicles equipped with some type of ADAS had AEB.

In 2018, 84.6% of cars had a kind of AEB in Japan, but the certification goal was not met by each of them.

The Japanese government will make its domestic carmakers fit all new and remodeled passenger cars with automatic emergency braking (AEB) from November 2021 amid a rise in the number of traffic accidents involving older motorists. Models already on the market will be required to be equipped with such systems from December 2025. For imports into Japan made by overseas marques, new vehicles will be required to be equipped with AEB from about June 2024 and for existing models from about June 2026.

— autofile «Japan to make automatic-emergency braking mandatory» 18 December 2019.

=== As a mandatory feature ===
From the fiscal year 2021, in Japan, all new cars should have automatic braking systems to prevent accidents, including with a car or pedestrian but not with cyclists, at speeds defined by three international regulations.

In the European Union, advanced emergency-braking system is required by law on new vehicle models from May 2022, and all new vehicles sold by May 2024.

In India, autonomous emergency braking system (AEB) could become mandatory on new cars by 2022.

In the United States, automakers voluntary committed to releasing automatic emergency braking as a standard feature on all new cars and trucks starting in 2022, to provide AEB three years earlier than through a regulatory process. AEB is set to be mandatory in cars and light trucks by September 2029.

In Australia where AEB is not yet mandatory, the federal government has suggested in a Regulation Impact Statement (RIS) that car-to-car and pedestrian AEB should be standard on all new models launched from July 2022 and all new vehicles sold from July 2024 like in the European Union. AEB systems are required on all newly introduced vehicle models from March 2023, and all models on sale in Australia from March 2025.

== Legal changes applicable from 2025 ==
For HGVs and buses, new UNECE standards have been defined to improve AEB. From 2025, in the EU, those new standards will apply to new types of vehicle.

Those changes were raised after crash inquiries which found some lorry drivers regularly switch off their AEB systems to drive closer to the vehicle in front. The regulation change will limit system deactivation to 15 minutes with automatic re-engagement after 15 minutes.

== Benefits and limitations ==
=== Benefits ===
A 2012 study by the Insurance Institute for Highway Safety examined how particular features of crash-avoidance systems affected the number of claims under various forms of insurance coverage. The findings indicate that two crash-avoidance features provide the biggest benefits: (a) autonomous braking that would brake on its own, if the driver does not, to avoid a forward collision, and (b) adaptive headlights that would shift the headlights in the direction the driver steers. They found lane departure systems to be not helpful, and perhaps harmful, at the circa 2012 stage of development. A 2015 Insurance Institute for Highway Safety study found forward collision warning and automatic braking systems reduced rear collisions.

A 2015 study based on European and Australasian data suggests the AEB can decrease rear-end collisions by 38%.

In the 2016 Berlin truck attack, the vehicle used was brought to a stop by its automatic braking system. Collision avoidance features are rapidly making their way into the new vehicle fleet. In a study of police-reported crashes, automatic emergency braking was found to reduce the incidence of rear-end crashes by 39 percent. A 2012 study suggests that if all cars feature the system, it will reduce accidents by up to 27 percent and save up to 8,000 lives per year on European roads.

A 2016 US study on trucks, considering 6,000 CAS activations from over 3 million miles and 110,000 hours driving performed with year 2013 technology, find that CAS activations were the result of lead vehicle actions, such as braking, turning, switching lanes, or merging.

In the UK and the US, third-party damages and costs have decreased by 10% and 40% according to some insurances.

Efficiency varies depending on analysis, according to the European Commission:

- 38% drop in accidents according to Fildes, 2015
- 9%-20% drop in collision according to Volvo
- 44% drop according to Ciccino

In April 2019, IIHS/HLDI considered real-world benefits of crash avoidance technologies, based on rates of police-reported crashes and insurance claims. Forward collision warning plus autobrake is associated with a 50% decrease in front to rear crashes and a 56% decrease in front to rear crashes with injuries, while forward collision warning alone is associated with only a 27% decrease in front to rear crashes and an only 20% decrease in front to rear crashes with injuries. The rear automatic braking is considered to have generated a 78% decrease in backing crashes (when combined with the rearview camera and parking sensor). However, repair costs with this equipment are an average of US$109 higher due to the sensors being in areas prone to damage.

In Australia, AEB has been found to reduce police-reported crashes by 55 percent, rear-end crashes by 40 percent, and vehicle occupant trauma by 28 percent.

A 2020 Italian study suggests AEB reduces rear-end collision by 45% based on data from event data recorders in a sample of 1.5 million vehicles in 2017 and 1.8 million in 2018, for recent vehicles.

It has been estimated that ALKS could help to avoid 47,000 serious accidents and save 3,900 lives over the first decade in the United Kingdom.

=== Limitations and safety issues ===
A NTSB communication suggests that some vehicle collision avoidance assist systems are not able to detect damaged crash attenuators. Therefore, the vehicle may drive into the crash attenuator. The NTSB considers such a feature would be a must-have for safety with partially automated vehicles to detect potential hazards and warn of potential hazards to drivers.

Inclement weather such as heavy rain, snow, or fog may temporarily inhibit the effectiveness of the systems.

In Japan, there were 72 car-reported accidents in 2017, 101 in 2018, and 80 between January and September 2019 caused by drivers placing too much confidence in automatic brakes, with 18 of them resulting in injuries or death.

=== Unnecessary AEB ===
Unnecessary AEB might trigger in situations such as shadows on the road, cars parked or metal road signs on the side of the middle of a curve, steep driveways.

== Features ==
AEB systems aim to detect possible collisions with the car in front. This is performed using sensors to detect and classify things in front of the vehicle, a system to interpret the data from the sensors, and a braking system which can work autonomously.

Some cars may implement lane departure warning systems.

=== Pedestrian detection ===
Since 2004, Honda has developed a night vision system that highlights pedestrians in front of the vehicle by alerting the driver with an audible chime and visually displaying them via HUD. Honda's system only works in temperatures below 30 degrees Celsius (86 Fahrenheit). This system first appeared on the Honda Legend.

To assist in pedestrian safety as well as driver safety, Volvo implemented a pedestrian airbag in the Volvo V40, introduced in 2012. Many more manufacturers are developing Pedestrian crash avoidance mitigation (PCAM) systems.

In the United States, the Insurance Institute for Highway Safety (IIHS) considers:

AEB with pedestrian detection was associated with significant reductions of 25%-27% in pedestrian crash risk and 29%-30% in pedestrian injury crash risk. However, there was not evidence that that the system was effective in dark conditions without street lighting, at speed limits of 50 mph or greater, or while the AEB- equipped vehicle was turning.

AEB with pedestrian detection was a feature to be included in the US National Highway Transportation Safety Authority's New Car Assessment Program, a safety scoring system for vehicles, but its inclusion was delayed in 2025 at the request of motordom.

=== ANCAP reports ===
Since 2018, the ANCAP provides AEB rating and tests AEB features.

The ANCAP report in its adult occupant protection section contains AEB rating taking into account AEB City from 10 to 50 km/h.

The ANCAP report in its vulnerable user protection section contains AEB rating taking into account both AEB and FCW for pedestrian and cyclists, with various speeds named "Operational from" (for instance 10 to 80 km/h) in the reports:

- For pedestrians in day and night: adult crossing, a child running, and an adult walking along.
- For cyclists in the day only: cyclist crossing, a cyclist traveling along.

The ANCAP report in its safety assist section contains AEB rating taking into account the AEB interurban with various speeds named "Operational from" (for instance 10 to 180 km/h):

- HMI performance
- FCW (stationary and slower-moving car)
- AEB interurban (car braking lightly, car braking heavily, driving toward slower-moving car)

=== Reverse automatic braking ===
In the US by 2017, 5% of cars were capable of reverse automatic braking. This feature allows autonomous braking of the vehicle while working in the reverse direction, to avoid a reverse collision. Those systems are assessed by IIHS.

== See also ==
- Collision avoidance system
