= Volvo XC40 =

Swedish subcompact crossover SUV

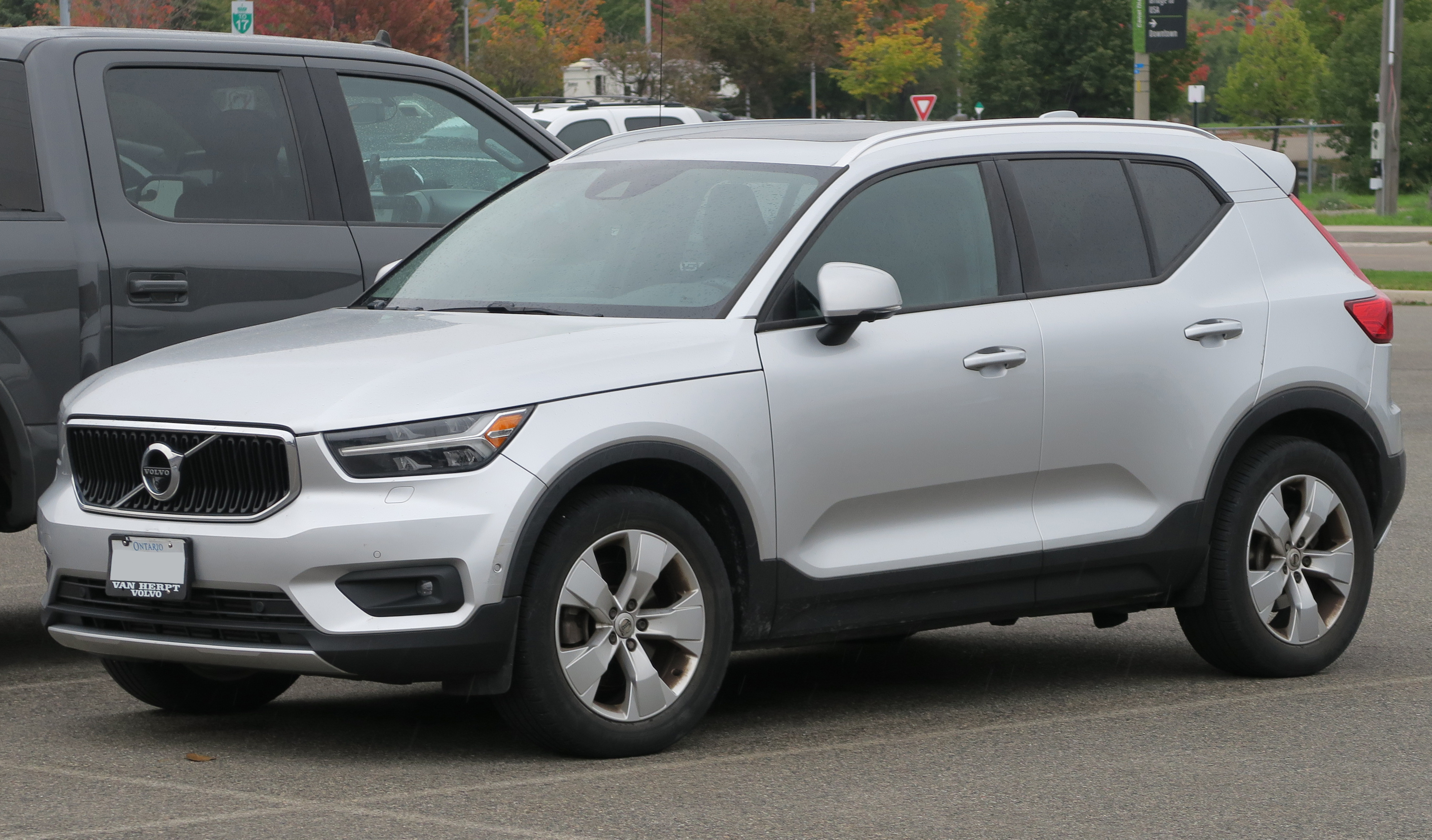

Overview
- Manufacturer: Volvo Cars
- Also called: Volvo EX40 (electric, 2024–present); Volvo C40 (coupé SUV, 2021–2024); Volvo EC40 (coupé SUV, 2024–present)
- Production: November 2017 – present; September 2021 – present (coupé SUV)
- Model years: 2019–present; 2022–present (coupé SUV)
- Assembly: Belgium: Ghent (VCG); China: Luqiao, Zhejiang (Luqiao CMA Super Factory); Malaysia: Shah Alam (VCMM); India: Hoskote, Bangalore
- Designer: Ian Kettle; Thomas Ingenlath; Katharina Sachs (C40/EC40)

Body and chassis
- Class: Subcompact crossover SUV (C)
- Body style: 5-door SUV; 5-door coupé SUV (C40/EC40)
- Layout: Front-engine, front-wheel-drive; Front-engine, all-wheel-drive; Front-motor, front-wheel-drive (EV, 2018–23); Rear-motor, rear-wheel-drive (EV, 2023–present); Dual-motor, all-wheel-drive (EV)
- Platform: Compact Modular Architecture
- Related: Polestar 2; Lynk & Co 01

Powertrain
- Engine: Petrol: 1.5 L B3154 I3 turbo; 2.0 L B4204 I4 turbo; Petrol hybrid: 1.5 L B3154T5 I3 turbo; Diesel: 2.0 L D4204 I4 turbo
- Electric motor: Permanent magnet synchronous: 60 kW (XC40 T4 & T5 Recharge); 131 kW (XC40 T5 Recharge AWD)
- Transmission: 6-speed M76 manual; 7-speed 7DCT DCT; 8-speed AW TG-81SC automatic; Single-speed automatic (EV)
- Hybrid drivetrain: PHEV (XC40 T4 & T5 Recharge); MHEV (XC40 B4)
- Battery: 10.7 kWh lithium-ion (PHEV); 75.0 kWh NMC (EV, 2018–22); 82.0 kWh NMC (EV, 2022–present)
- Electric range: 418–569 km (260–354 mi) (XC40 EV, WLTP); 415–578 km (258–359 mi) (C40 EV, WLTP)
- Plug-in charging: CCS @ 11 kW (AC), 150 kW (DC peak)

Dimensions
- Wheelbase: 2,702 mm (106.4 in)
- Length: 4,425 mm (174.2 in); 4,431 mm (174.4 in) (C40)
- Width: 1,863 mm (73.3 in)
- Height: 1,652 mm (65.0 in); 1,582 mm (62.3 in) (C40)
- Curb weight: 1,497–1,733 kg (3,300–3,821 lb)

The Volvo XC40 is a subcompact crossover SUV (C-segment) manufactured by Volvo Cars. It was unveiled on 21 September 2017 as the smallest SUV model from Volvo, below the XC60. Orders started in September 2017, and manufacturing began in November 2017.

Along with conventional petrol and diesel engines, a plug-in hybrid model was introduced in 2019, and a fully electric model was released in 2020. Both the plug-in hybrid and the electric versions were marketed as the XC40 Recharge. In 2024, Volvo renamed the battery electric XC40 to the Volvo EX40, aligning it with newer battery electric models such as the EX30 and the EX90.

A coupe version of the battery electric model with a sloping rear roof was released in 2021 as the C40 Recharge. It was renamed the Volvo EC40 in 2024.

The XC40 received the European Car of the Year Award at the 2018 Geneva Motor Show. and the car was named Car of the Year Japan for 2018/2019.

== Overview ==
The design of the XC40 was previewed by concept car called the Concept 40.1, which was designed by Thomas Ingenlath, and unveiled in May 2016.^{[1]} The XC40 is the first Volvo to be based on the CMA platform, to be shared by other compact Volvos, Geely, and Lynk & Co model. The platform was designed to maximise interior space.

The XC40 comes in front-wheel drive, rear-wheel drive (electric, from 2023) and all-wheel drive, and is powered by Volvo's 1.5-litre three cylinder and existing 2.0-litre four-cylinder engines, in both diesel and petrol variants. From 2019, a FWD plug-in hybrid named "T5 Twin Engine" is available, combining a 180 PS (178 hp; 132 kW) petrol version of the 1.5-litre engine with an 74 PS (73 hp; 54 kW) electric motor. In 2022, a mild hybrid version was introduced. In the United States, engine choices are limited to the 2.0-litre four-cylinder petrol powered T4 and T5 models. In 2023, Volvo removed conventional engines as an option, meaning mild hybrids are the base engine option in the US. The version tested by Euro NCAP in 2018 had a kerb weight of 1,680 kilograms (3,700 lb).

Volvo Intellisafe is installed as standard. This technology is designed with the intention of preventing runoff road accidents. By using the car's advanced sensory system, the technology can detect potentially fatal scenarios such as run off-road protection. Safety belts are also capable of being automatically adjusted throughout these moments of impact while energy absorbing seat frames and seats are in place to prevent spine injuries. This technology was created based on real life data, and various crash test track methods such as: ditch, airborne and rough terrains.

The XC40 was given the European Car of the Year Award at the 2018 Geneva Motor Show. and the car was named Car of the Year Japan for 2018/2019. The XC40 was awarded Car of the Year by the magazine What Car? in January 2018, also Carsales Car of the Year in 2018, and Irish Car of the Year in 2019. The company increased their production across 2018 to 2019 to meet global demand.

In June 2020, Volvo stopped taking new orders for Diesel-engined XC40s and production ended shortly thereafter. Volvo planned on discontinuing all diesels beginning in 2021, as the new, fully electric Recharge version was coming on stream and as customer preferences were rapidly changing away from diesels. In the United Kingdom, for instance, the share of XC40 diesels had dropped from 36.5 percent in 2019 to 19% for the first half of 2020.

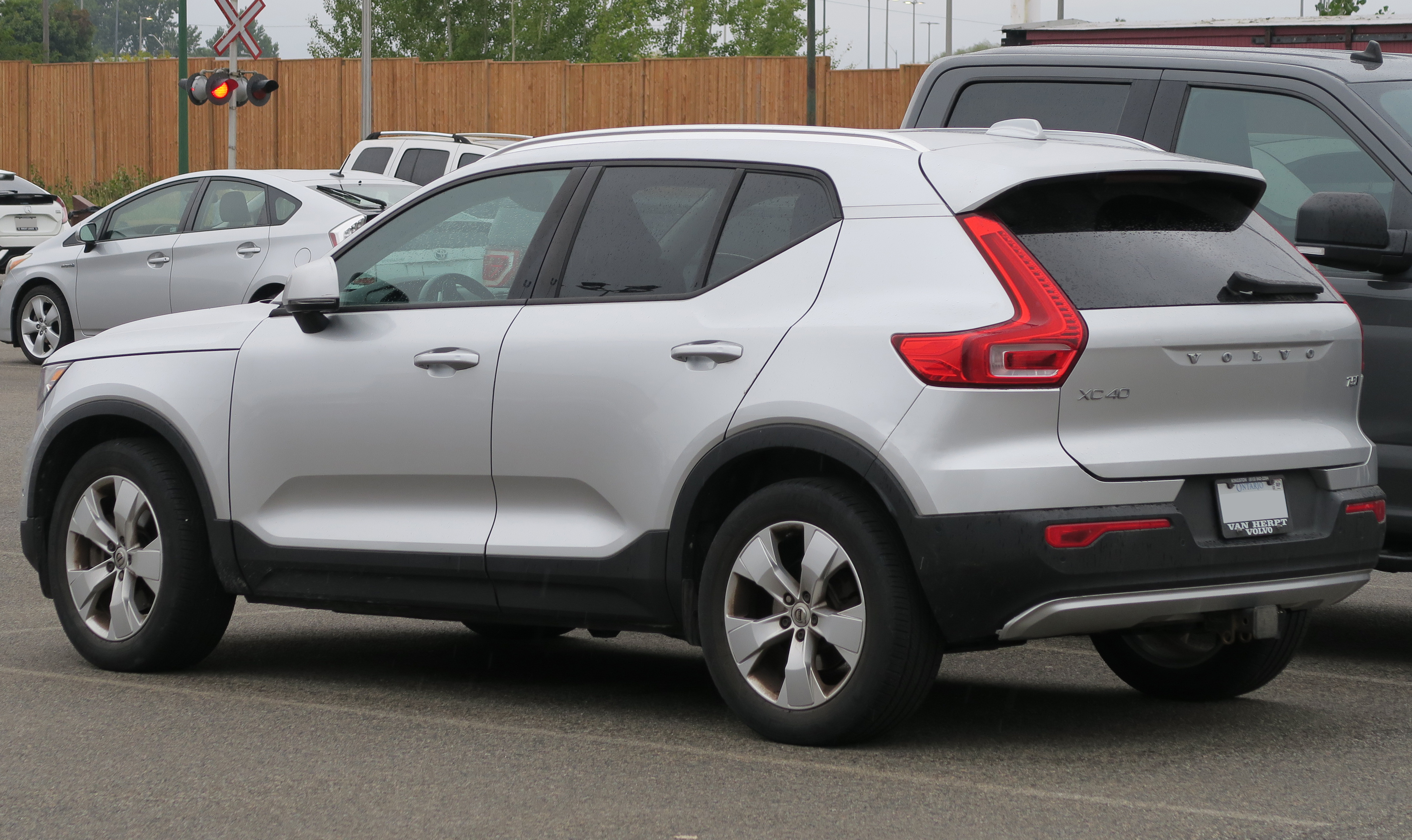
Volvo XC40 T5 Momentum

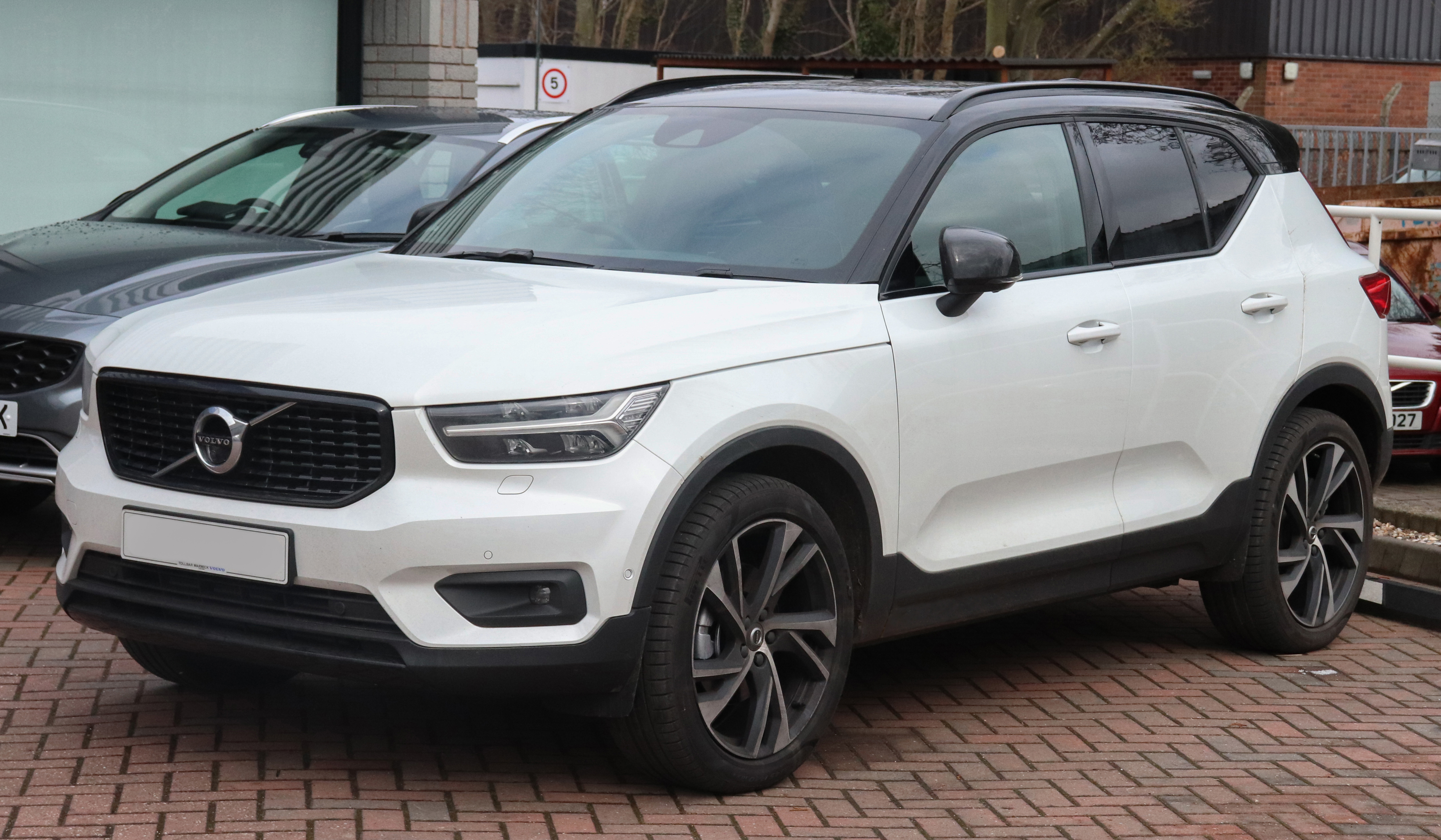
Volvo XC40 T5 First Edition AWD

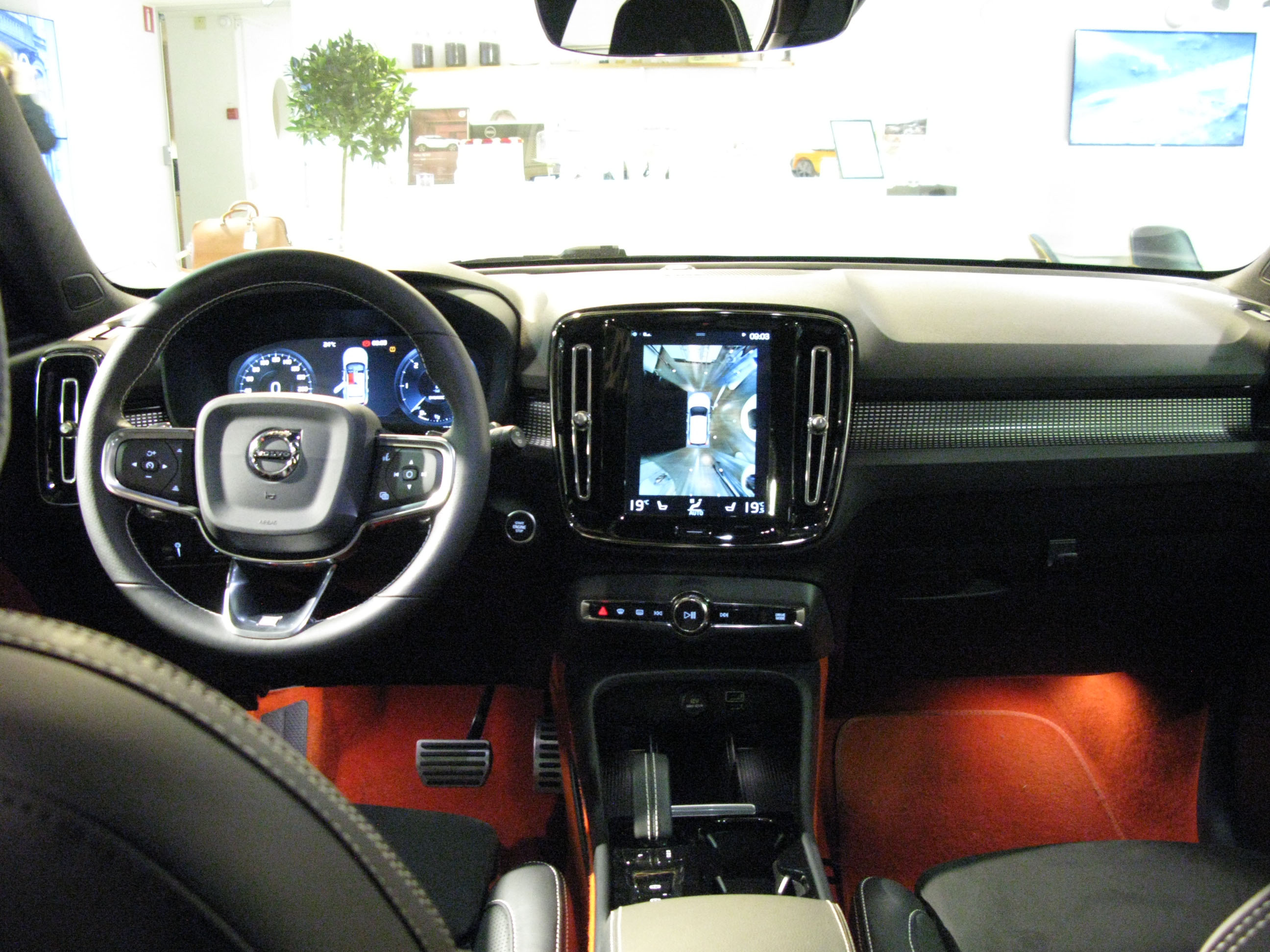
Interior

== XC40 Recharge Pure Electric / EX40 ==
The XC40 Recharge Pure Electric is Volvo's first battery electric model, which was revealed on 16 October 2019. It is powered by a 78 kWh battery pack.

It went on sale in late 2020, with limited quantities available in select markets. Volvo announced that after the XC40 Recharge, it plans to "launch one new electric vehicle every year, and pledges to make half its lineup fully electric by 2025."

In 2023, the single motor version was revised by adopting the rear-wheel drive layout instead of front-wheel drive. It is the first rear-wheel-drive variant of a Volvo vehicle in 25 years. The revised version received a new motor, resulting in improved range and efficiency.

In 2024, the XC40 Recharge Pure Electric was renamed to the EX40.

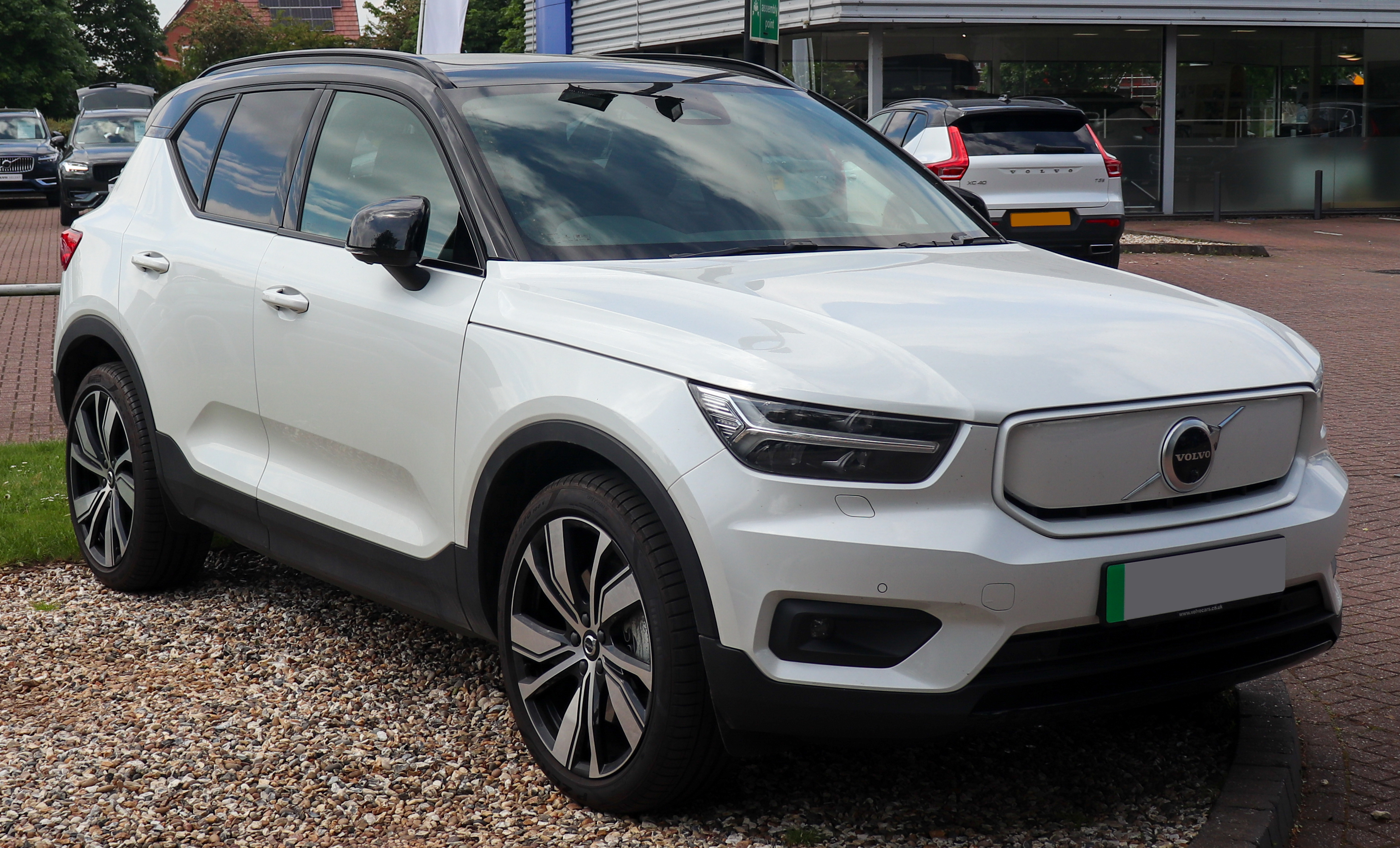
Volvo XC40 Recharge (pre-facelift)

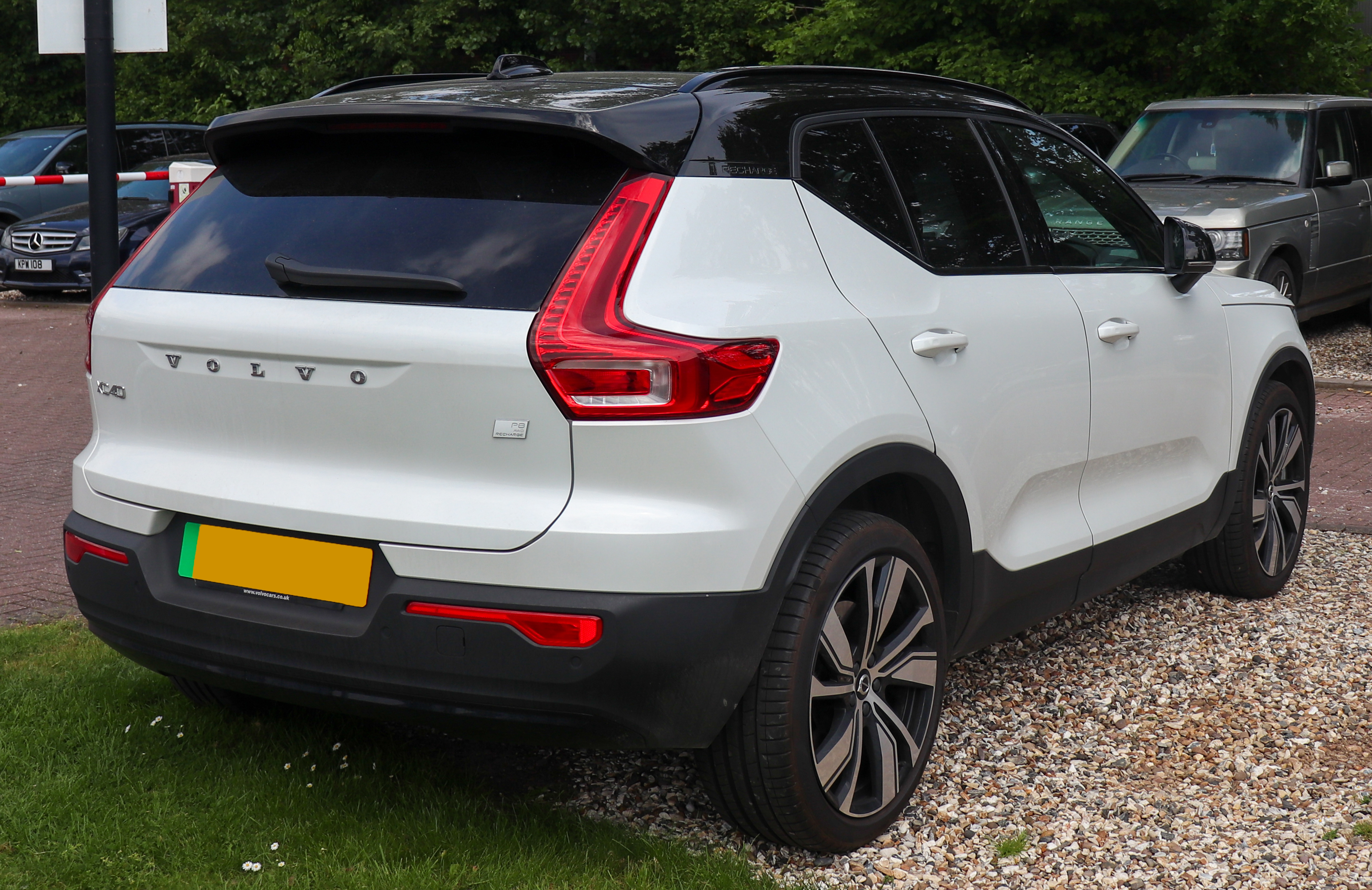
Volvo XC40 Recharge (pre-facelift)

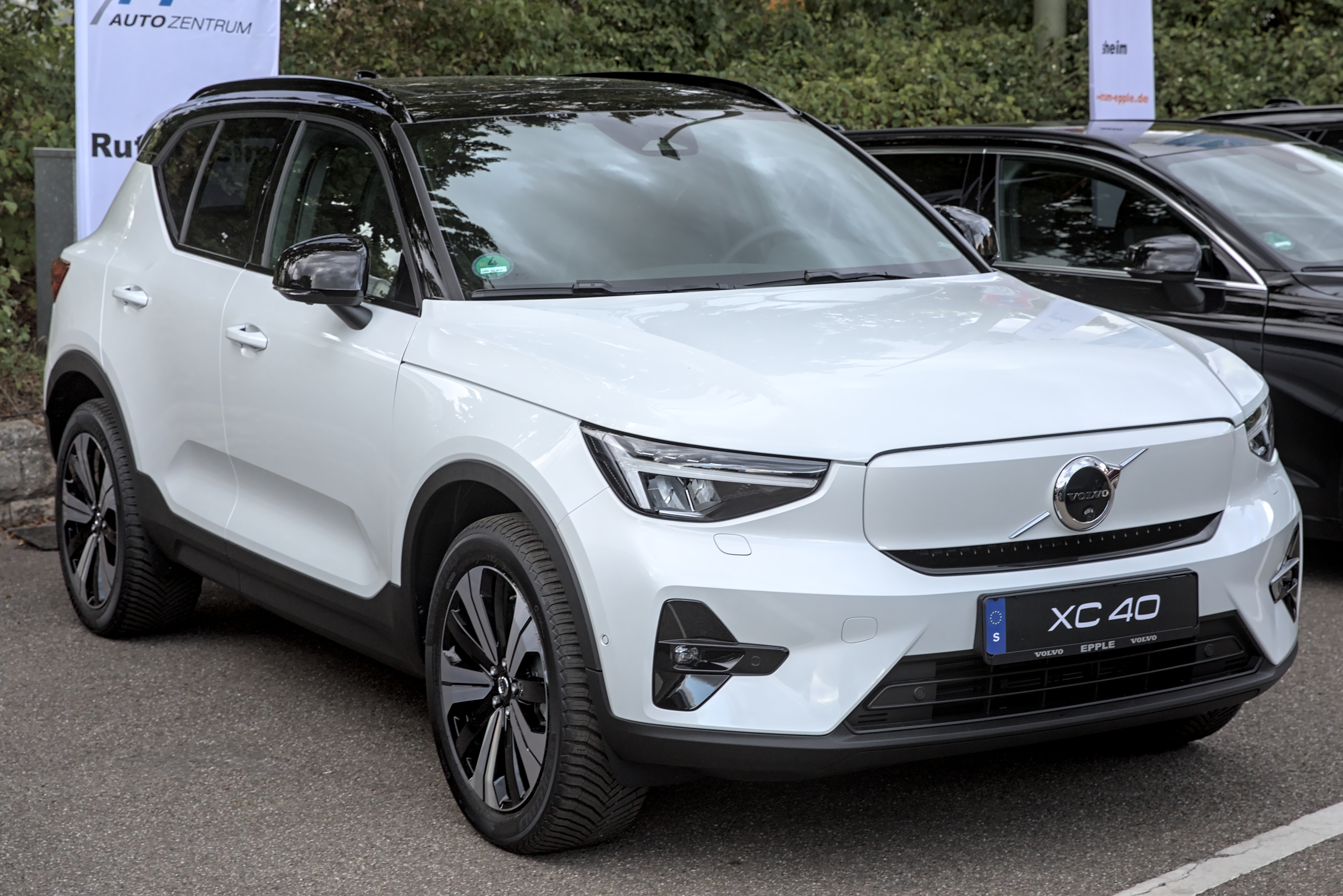
Volvo XC40 Recharge (facelift)

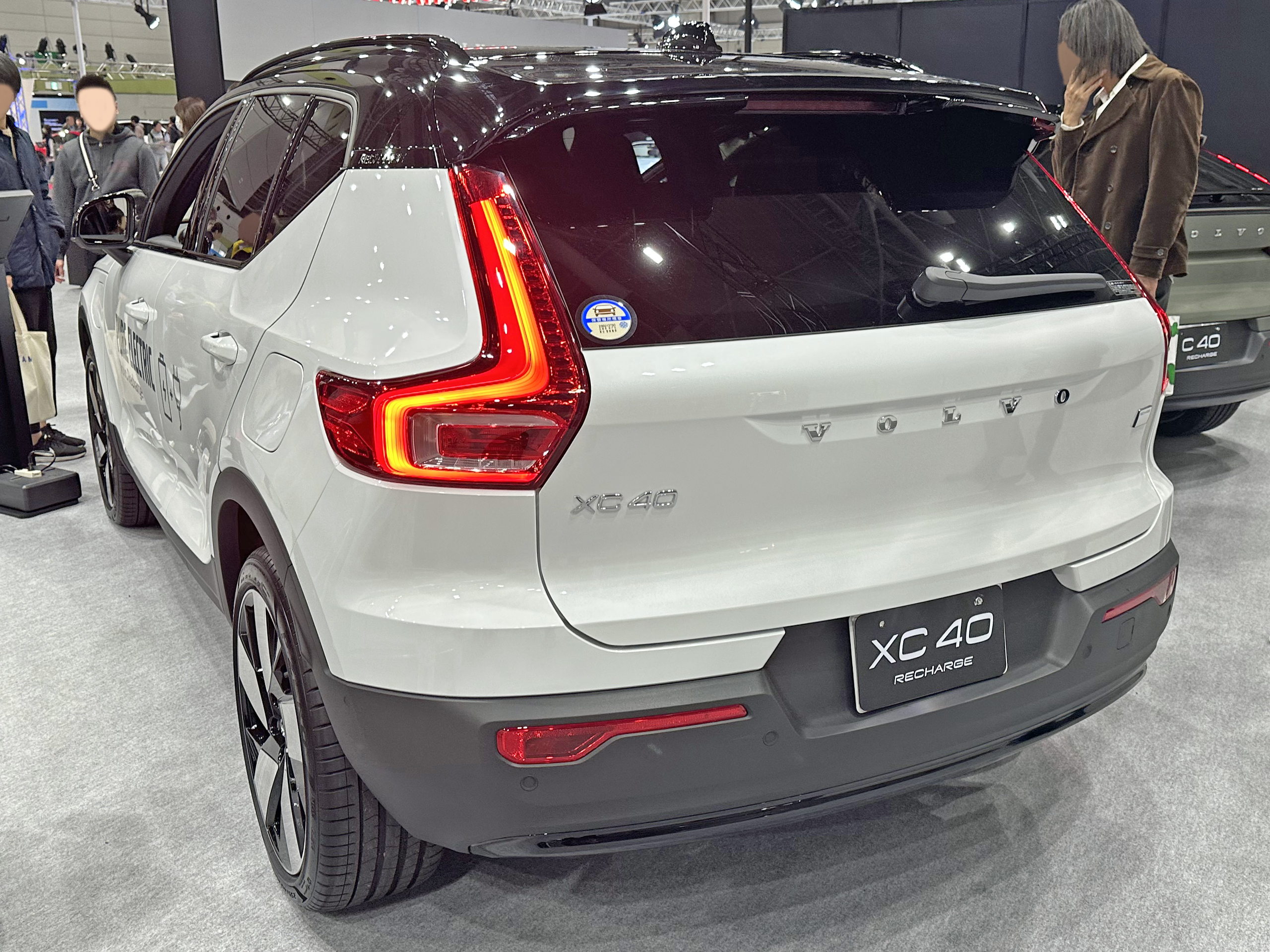
Volvo XC40 Recharge (facelift)

== C40 Recharge / EC40 ==
The C40 Recharge is a derivative of the XC40 Recharge, which was released on 2 March 2021. It officially commenced production in September 2021. It is also the first Volvo nameplate that is only available as a battery electric vehicle. It was renamed to the EC40 in 2024.

The model shared the front end, front doors and interior design as the conventional XC40. The main difference between the XC40 and the C40 is the roofline, with the C40 having a coupe-style sloping roofline.

The C40's electric drivetrain is nearly identical to the battery electric XC40 Recharge. It uses a 78 kWh lithium-ion battery pack (75 kWh usable) to power its dual motors and has an EPA-estimated range of 226 miles (364 km), three miles (4.8 km) more than the XC40 Recharge. The version tested by Euro NCAP in 2022 had a kerb weight of 2,149 kilograms (4,738 lb).

Similar to the XC40 Recharge Pure Electric, the C40 received a revised version with rear-wheel drive instead of front-wheel drive for the single motor version. The update improved range amongst other things.

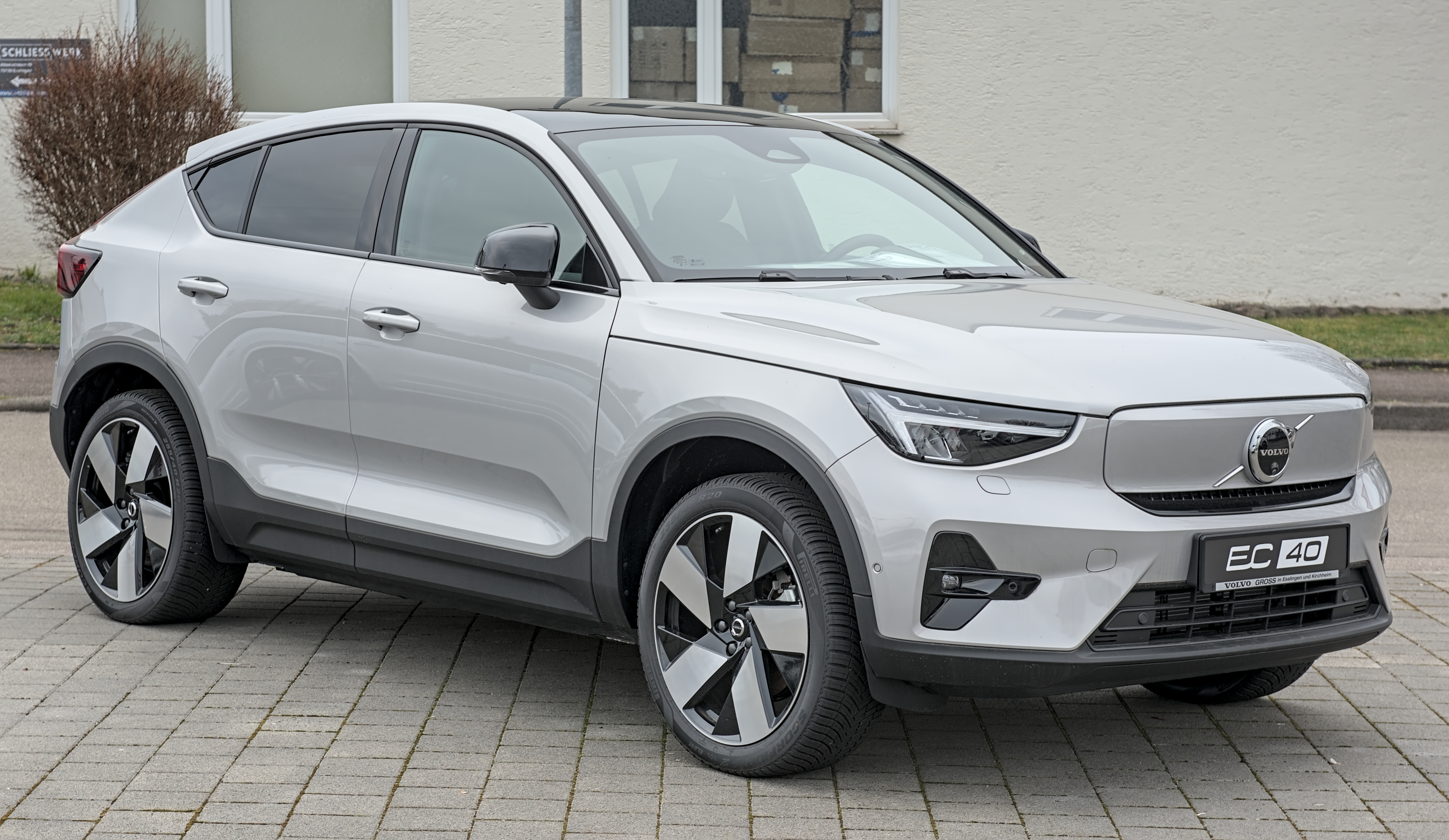
C40 Recharge

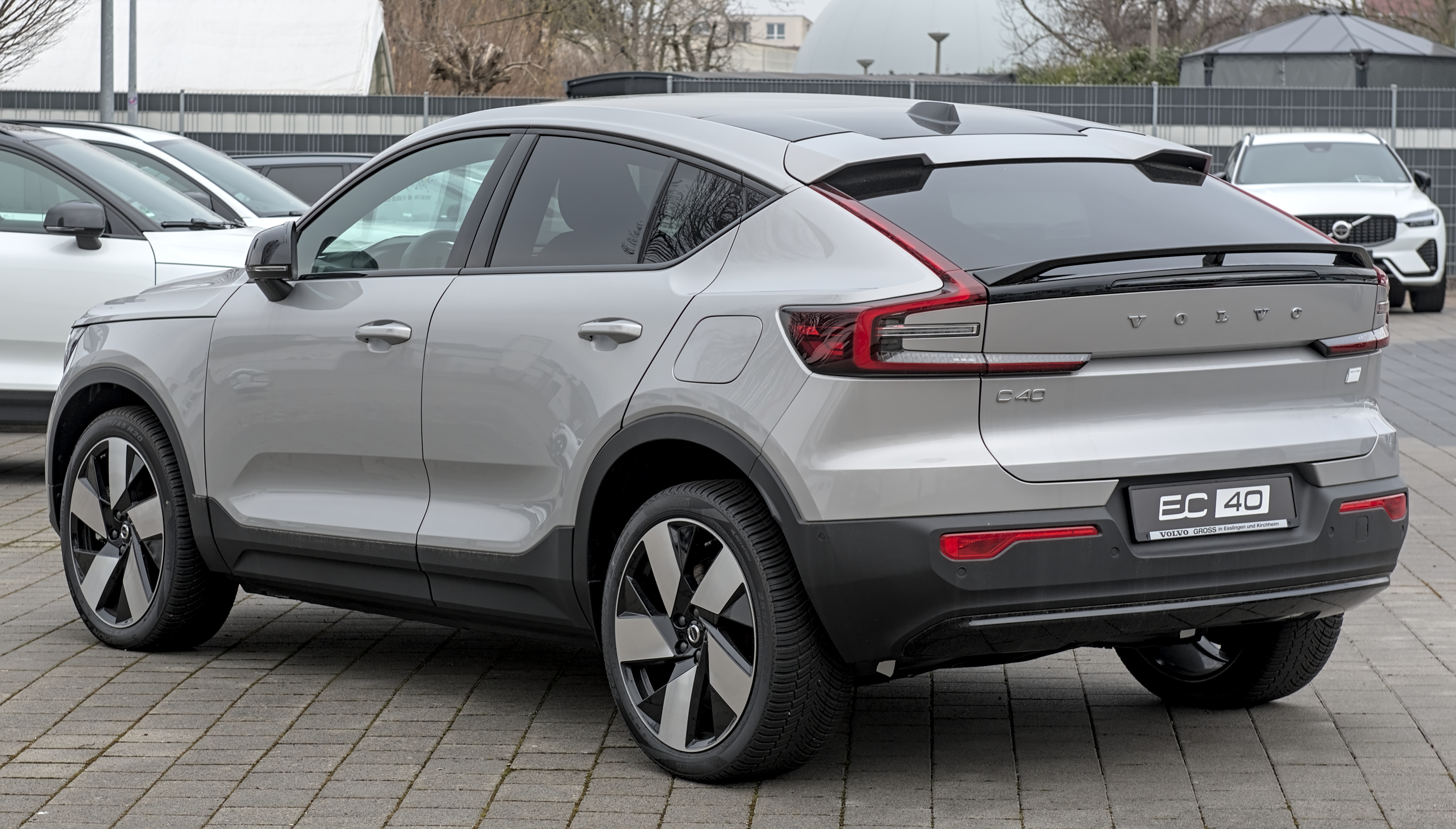
C40 Recharge

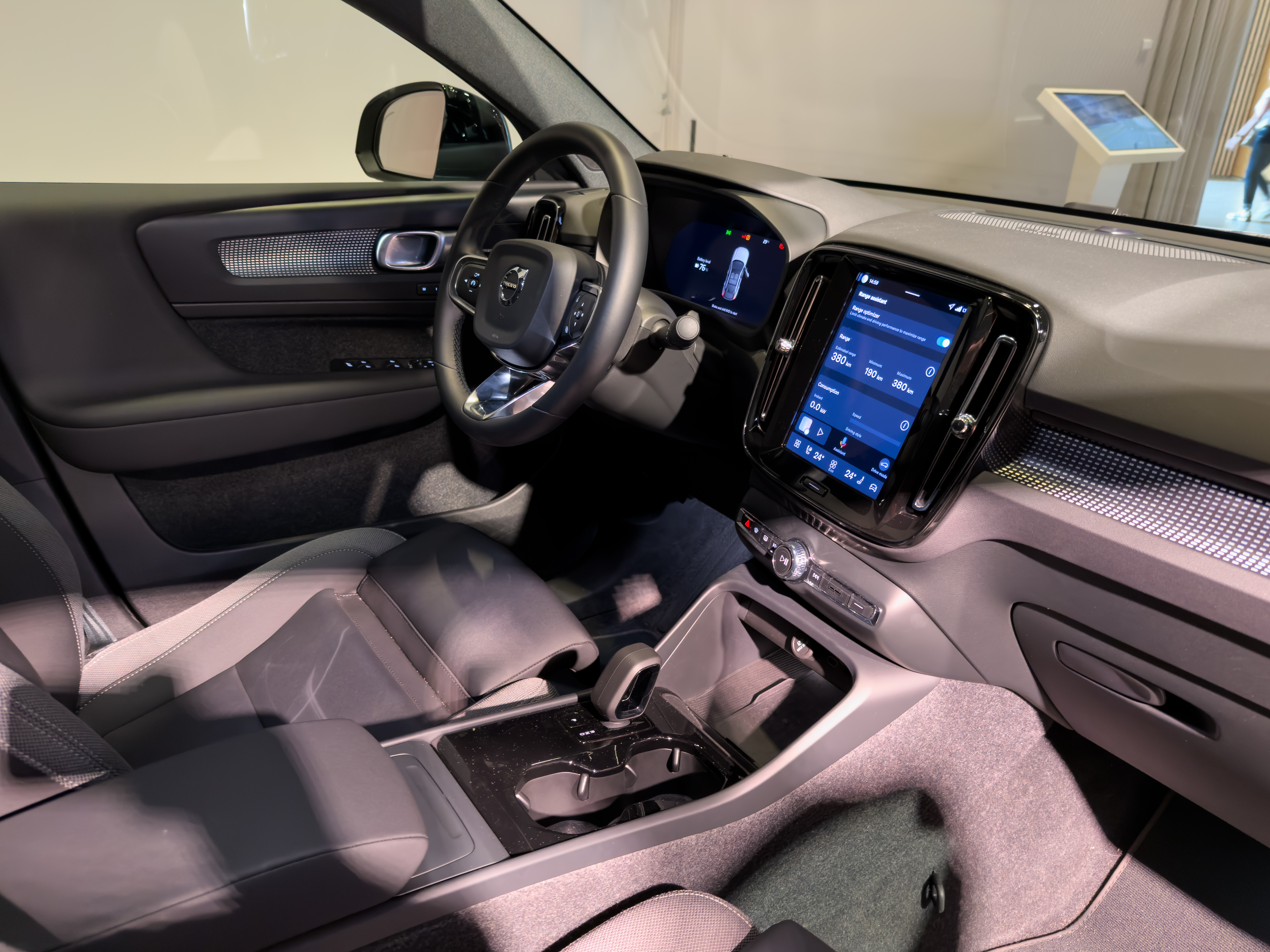
Interior of an EC40

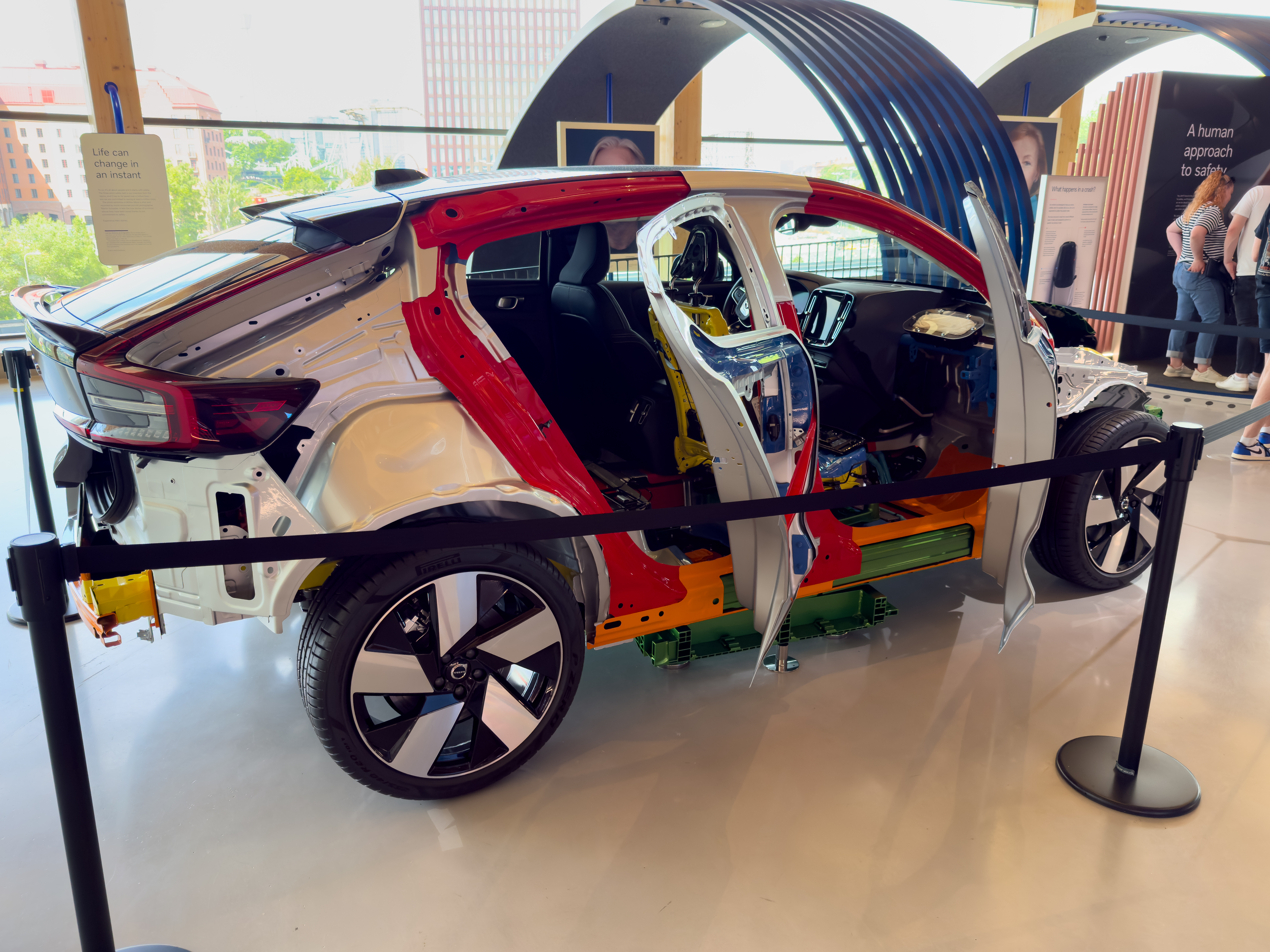
Cut-open EC40 at the World of Volvo demonstrating safety features

== Facelifts ==
=== 2023 facelift ===
The XC40 received a first facelift for the 2023 model year. In late 2021, photos had been leaked exposing pictures of the new XC40. In February 2022, the first facelift was quietly unveiled on Volvo configurator. The XC40 received aesthetic changes that bring it more into line with the C40 Recharge (headlights, bumpers, Android Automotive for the mild hybrid models, new ADAS sensor platform, etc.). Since 2020, the XC40 lineup had been offered exclusively with petrol, petrol hybrid, or full electric drivetrains.

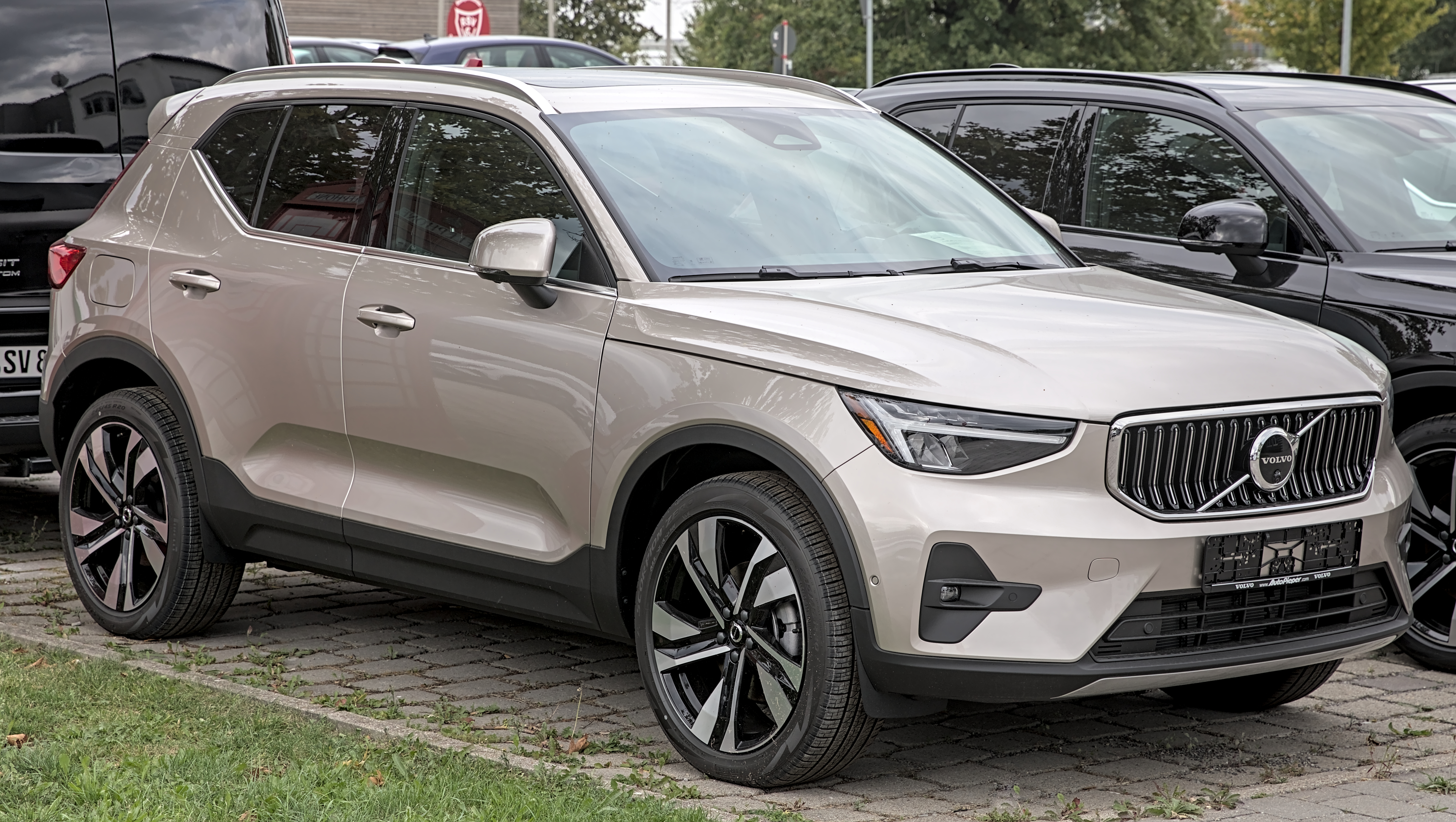
XC40 B4 (first facelift)

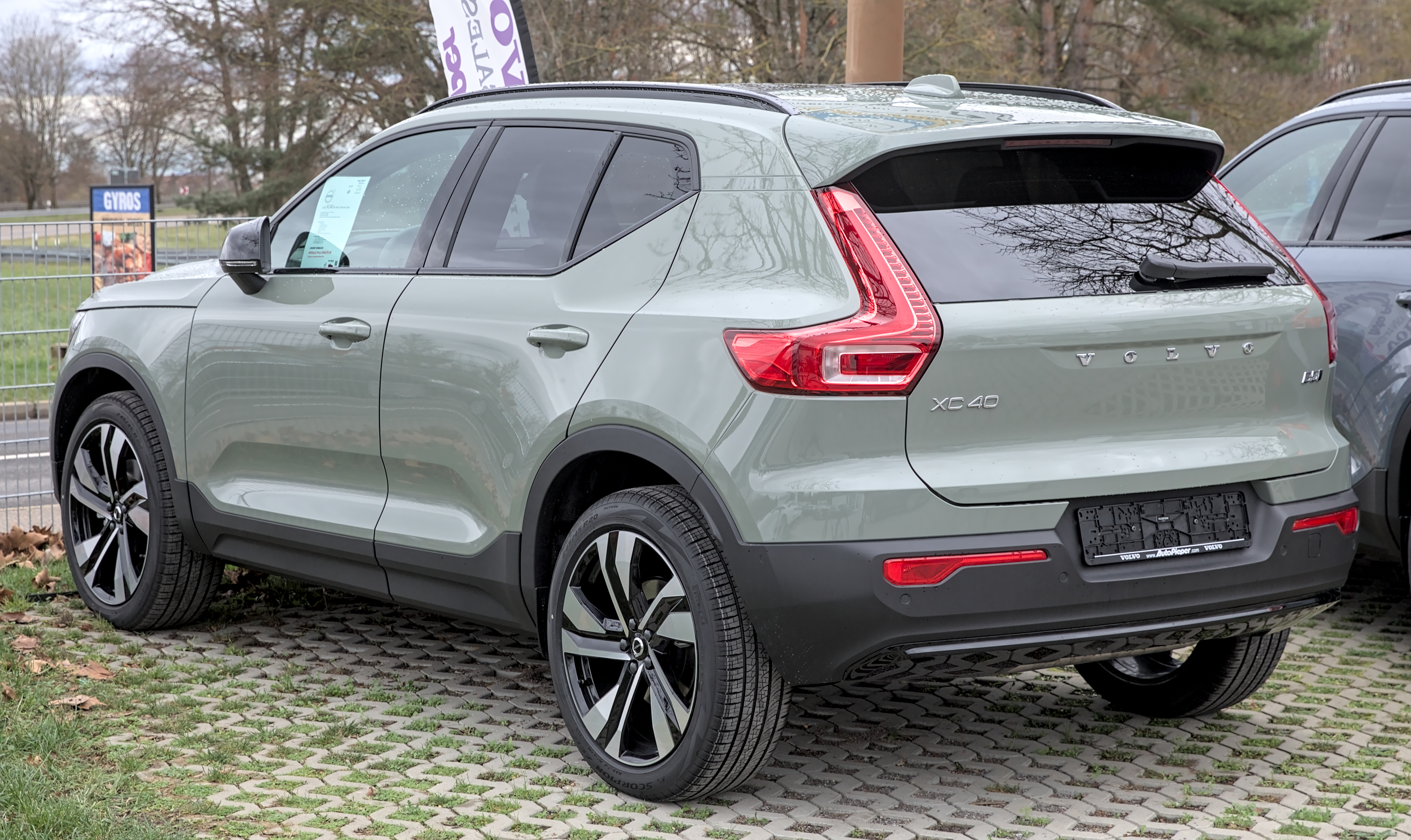
XC40 B4 (first facelift)

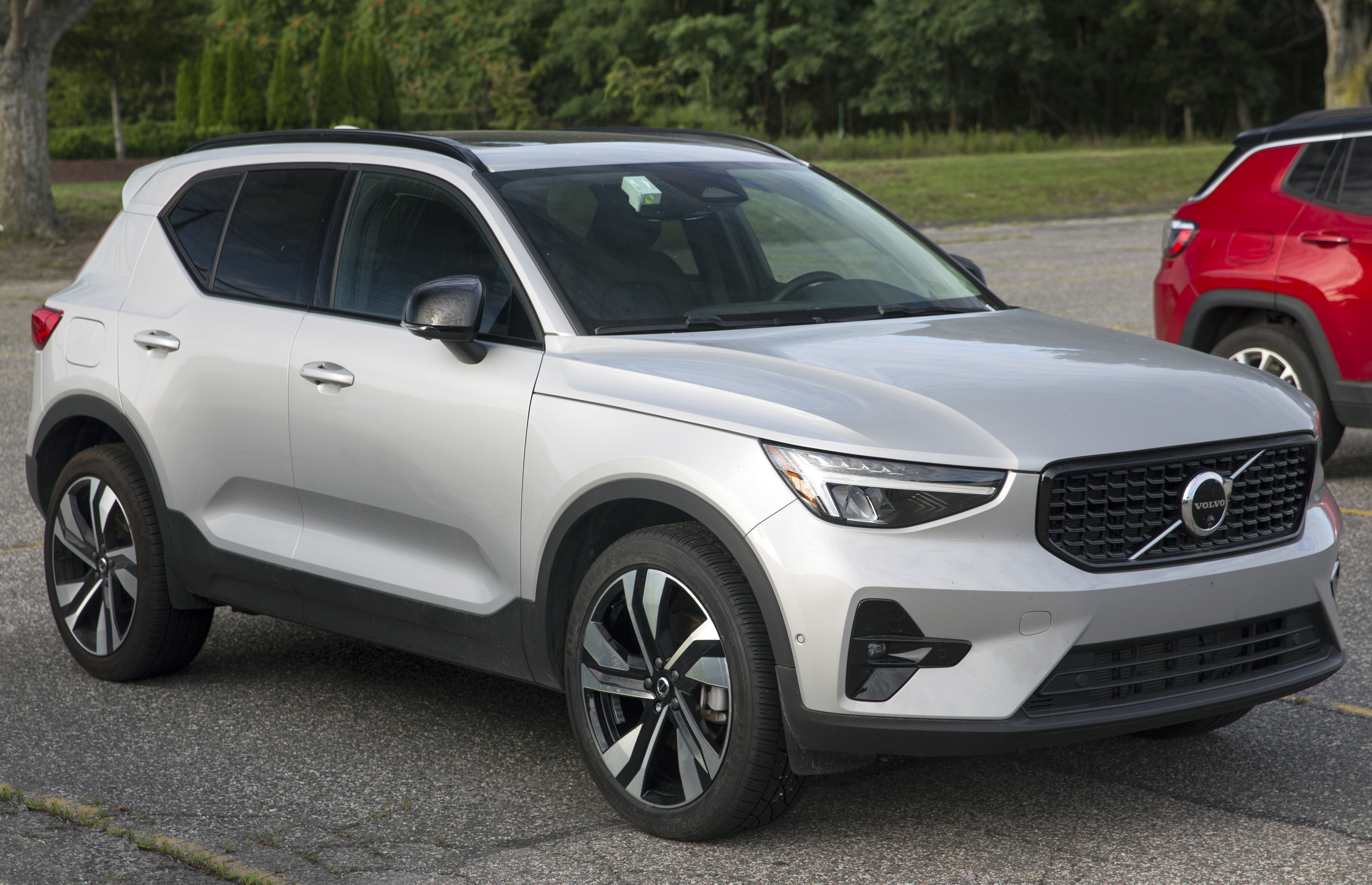
XC40 (first facelift, "Dark Theme")

=== 2028 facelift ===
The XC40, EX40 and EC40 received a second facelift for the 2028 model year while the 2027 model year was skipped. Various changes was made to the exterior, such as a new front fascia including the hood, Thor's hammer headlights and bumper, an updated rear fascia including the taillight signature and tailgate shape, as well as new color designs. The EC40's rear remains unchanged. The interior was also updated with changes that mirror the 2025 facelifts of the XC60 and XC90, including a floating 11.2-inch central display supporting Google Gemini, new indirect ambient lighting, and new upholstery options. Finally, safety hardware and software equipment have also been upgraded, allowing for new features such as a safe exit alert.

EX40 (second facelift)

EX40 (second facelift)

Interior of an EX40

== Powertrain ==
Petrol engines
Model	Engine code	Year(s)	Power at rpm	Torque at rpm	Displacement	Notes
T2	B3154T9	2020–present	129 PS (95 kW; 127 hp) at 5000	245 N⋅m (181 lb⋅ft) at 1600–3000	1.5 L (1,477 cc)	Turbocharged inline-3
T3	B3154T7	2018–present	163 PS (120 kW; 161 hp) (Note: 156PS until 2019) at 5000	265 N⋅m (195 lb⋅ft) at 1850–3850	1.5 L (1,477 cc)	Turbocharged inline-3
T4; T4 AWD	B4204T47	2018–present	190 PS (140 kW; 187 hp) at 5000	300 N⋅m (221 lb⋅ft) at 1300–4000	2.0 L (1,969 cc)	Turbocharged inline-4
T5 AWD	B4204T14	2017–present	247 PS (182 kW; 244 hp) at 5500	350 N⋅m (258 lb⋅ft) at 1800–4800	2.0 L (1,969 cc)	Turbocharged inline-4
T5 AWD	B4204T36	2017–present	249 PS (183 kW; 246 hp) at 5500	350 N⋅m (258 lb⋅ft) at 1800–4500	2.0 L (1,969 cc)	Turbocharged inline-4
T5 AWD	B4204T18	2017–present	252 PS (185 kW; 249 hp) at 5500	350 N⋅m (258 lb⋅ft) at 1500–4800	2.0 L (1,969 cc)	Turbocharged inline-4

Diesel engines
Model	Engine code	Year(s)	Power rpm	Torque rpm	Displacement	Notes
D3; D3 AWD	D4204T9	2018–2020	150 PS (110 kW; 148 hp) at 3750	320 N⋅m (236 lb⋅ft) at 1750–3000	2.0 L (1,969 cc)	Turbocharged inline-4
D4 AWD	D4204T12	2017–2020	190 PS (140 kW; 187 hp) at 4000	400 N⋅m (295 lb⋅ft) at 1750–2500	2.0 L (1,969 cc)	Turbocharged inline-4

Petrol hybrid engines
Model	Engine code	Year(s)	Power			Torque		Displacement	Notes
Model	Engine code	Year(s)	Engine	Motor	Total	Engine	Motor	Displacement	Notes
T4 Recharge	B3154T10	2020–2023	129 PS (95 kW; 127 hp) at 5000	82 PS (60 kW; 81 hp)	214 PS (157 kW; 211 hp) at 5000	245 N⋅m (181 lb⋅ft) at 1600–3000	160 N⋅m (118 lb⋅ft)	1.5 L (1,477 cc)	Turbocharged inline-3 and electric motor PHEV
T5 Twin Engine/T5 Recharge	B3154T5	2019–2023	180 PS (132 kW; 178 hp) at 5800	82 PS (60 kW; 81 hp)	265 PS (195 kW; 261 hp) at 5800	265 N⋅m (195 lb⋅ft) at 1500–3000	160 N⋅m (118 lb⋅ft)	1.5 L (1,477 cc)	Turbocharged inline-3 and electric motor PHEV
T5 Recharge AWD	B3154T10	2019–2023	129 PS (95 kW; 127 hp) at 5800	178 PS (131 kW; 176 hp)	309 PS (227 kW; 305 hp) at 5800	245 N⋅m (181 lb⋅ft) at 1600–3000	160 N⋅m (118 lb⋅ft)	1.5 L (1,477 cc)	Turbocharged inline-3 and two electric motors PHEV

Electric powertrains
Model	Motor	Year(s)	Power rpm	Torque rpm	Battery capacity	Range (WLTP)	Peak DC charging	Notes
XC40 Recharge Pure Electric	Front motor	June 2022 – 2023	231 PS (170 kW; 228 hp)	329 N⋅m (243 lb⋅ft)	69 kWh	425 km (264 mi)	150 kW	Electric motor on front axle
C40 Recharge Single Motor	Front motor	2021–2023	231 PS (170 kW; 228 hp)	329 N⋅m (243 lb⋅ft)	69 kWh	415 km (258 mi) (TEH)	150 kW	Electric motor on front axle
XC40 Recharge Single-motor	Rear motor	2023–present	238 PS (175 kW; 235 hp)	330 N⋅m (243 lb⋅ft)	69 kWh	474 km (295 mi)	175 kW	Electric motor on rear axle
C40 Recharge Single-motor	Rear motor	2023–present	238 PS (175 kW; 235 hp)	330 N⋅m (243 lb⋅ft)	69 kWh	485 km (301 mi)	175 kW	Electric motor on rear axle
XC40 Recharge Extended Range	Rear motor	2023–present	252 PS (185 kW; 249 hp)	420 N⋅m (310 lb⋅ft)	82 kWh	569 km (354 mi)	175 kW	Electric motor on rear axle
C40 Recharge Single motor Extended Range	Rear motor	2023–present	252 PS (185 kW; 249 hp)	420 N⋅m (310 lb⋅ft)	82 kWh	578 km (359 mi)	175 kW	Electric motor on rear axle
XC40 P8 AWD Recharge	Dual motors	2020–2023	408 PS (300 kW; 402 hp)	660 N⋅m (487 lb⋅ft)	78 kWh	418 km (260 mi)	150 kW	Electric motors on each axle
C40 Recharge Twin-motor	Dual motors	2020–2023	408 PS (300 kW; 402 hp)	660 N⋅m (487 lb⋅ft)	78 kWh	444 km (276 mi)	150 kW	Electric motors on each axle
XC40 Recharge Twin-motor	Dual motors	2023–present	408 PS (300 kW; 402 hp)	670 N⋅m (494 lb⋅ft)	82 kWh	536 km (333 mi)	175 kW	Electric motors on each axle
C40 Recharge Twin-motor	Dual motors	2023–present	408 PS (300 kW; 402 hp)	670 N⋅m (494 lb⋅ft)	82 kWh	549 km (341 mi)	175 kW	Electric motors on each axle

== Safety ==
Jennifer Homendy, head of the United States' National Transportation Safety Board, cited the battery-electric version of the XC40 as an example of an electric car that weighs around-a-third more than its internal-combustion-engine powered equivalent, alongside other products made by Ford, General Motors, and Toyota, while raising concerns about the increased potential for heavier vehicles to kill or seriously injure other road users in collisions.

=== Assisted safety ===
The vehicle has a 360-degree parking view, a cross-traffic safety alert with AEBS (automated emergency braking system) and ABS (anti-lock braking system), a BLIS (blind spot information system), and a LDWS (lane departure warning system).

=== XC40 ===
ANCAP test results* Volvo XC40 (2018, aligned with Euro NCAP)
Test	Points	%
Overall:	5 /5 stars	
Adult occupant:	37.1	97%
Child occupant:	41.6	84%
Pedestrian:	34.4	71%
Safety assist:	10.2	78%

Euro NCAP test results* Volvo XC40 D4 AWD Momentum (2018)
Test	Points	%
Overall:	5 /5 stars	
Adult occupant:	37.2	97%
Child occupant:	43	87%
Pedestrian:	34.5	71%
Safety assist:	10	76%

IIHS scores (2019)
Small overlap front (driver)	Good	
Small overlap front (passenger)	Good	
Moderate overlap front (original test)	Good	
Side (original test)	Good	
Side (updated test)	Acceptable	
Roof strength	Good	
Head restraints and seats	Good	
Headlights (varies by trim/option)	Good	Poor
Front crash prevention: vehicle-to-vehicle	Superior	
Front crash prevention: vehicle-to-pedestrian (Day)	Superior	
Child seat anchors (LATCH) ease of use	Acceptable	

=== C40 ===
ANCAP test results Volvo XC40 all single motor and twin motor variants (2022, aligned with Euro NCAP)
Test	Points	%
Overall:	5 /5 stars	
Adult occupant:	35.29	95%
Child occupant:	43.81	89%
Pedestrian:	37.86	70%
Safety assist:	14.57	91%

Euro NCAP test results Volvo C40 Recharge (2022)
Test	Points	%
Overall:	5 /5 stars	
Adult occupant:	35.3	92%
Child occupant:	44	89%
Pedestrian:	37.9	70%
Safety assist:	14.2	89%

IIHS scores (2022)
Small overlap front (driver)	Good
Small overlap front (passenger)	Good
Moderate overlap front (original test)	Good
Side (original test)	Good
Roof strength	Good
Head restraints and seats	Good
Headlights (varies by trim/option)	Good
Front crash prevention: vehicle-to-vehicle	Superior
Front crash prevention: vehicle-to-pedestrian (Day)	Advanced
Seatbelt reminders	Poor
Child seat anchors (LATCH) ease of use	Acceptable

== Sales ==
XC40 sales
Year	Europe	U.S.	China	Brazil	Global
2017	117		—		
2018	47,298	12,427	—	2,395	75,828
2019	82,457	17,654	13,216	2,429	139,847
2020	110,254	23,778	23,982	2,869	185,406
2021	123,847	26,802	14,244	3,593	201,037
2022	98,781	18,558	15,979	1,915	169,206
2023		28,143	13,022	1,802	200,670
2024		26,557	7,275		173,890
2025		23,980	2,027		

C40 sales
Year	Europe	U.S.	Brazil	China	Global
2021		42		—	1,196
2022	15,981	3,780	584	889	24,213
2023		6,589	841	1,089	37,114
2024	1578	1,420		159	20,380
2025				1	

== Awards and recognition ==
- European Car of the Year 2018
- Red Dot Design Award 2018
- Car of the Year Japan for 2018/2019
- Continental Irish Car of the Year 2019
- Carsales Car of the Year in 2018
- Straits Times readers’ favourite car of 2018
- Women's World Car of the Year 2018
- What Car? Car of the Year 2018
- What Car? Family SUV of the Year 2021 (for the Volvo XC40 T3 R-Design auto). The magazine awarded the XC40 five stars out of five in its review of the car.
- Wheels Car of the Year 2019
- Drive Car of the Year – Best Small Luxury SUV: The XC40 secured this award for four consecutive years 2021, 2022, 2023 and 2024
