= Advanced driver-assistance system =

Electronic systems that help a vehicle driver while driving or parking

Advanced driver-assistance systems
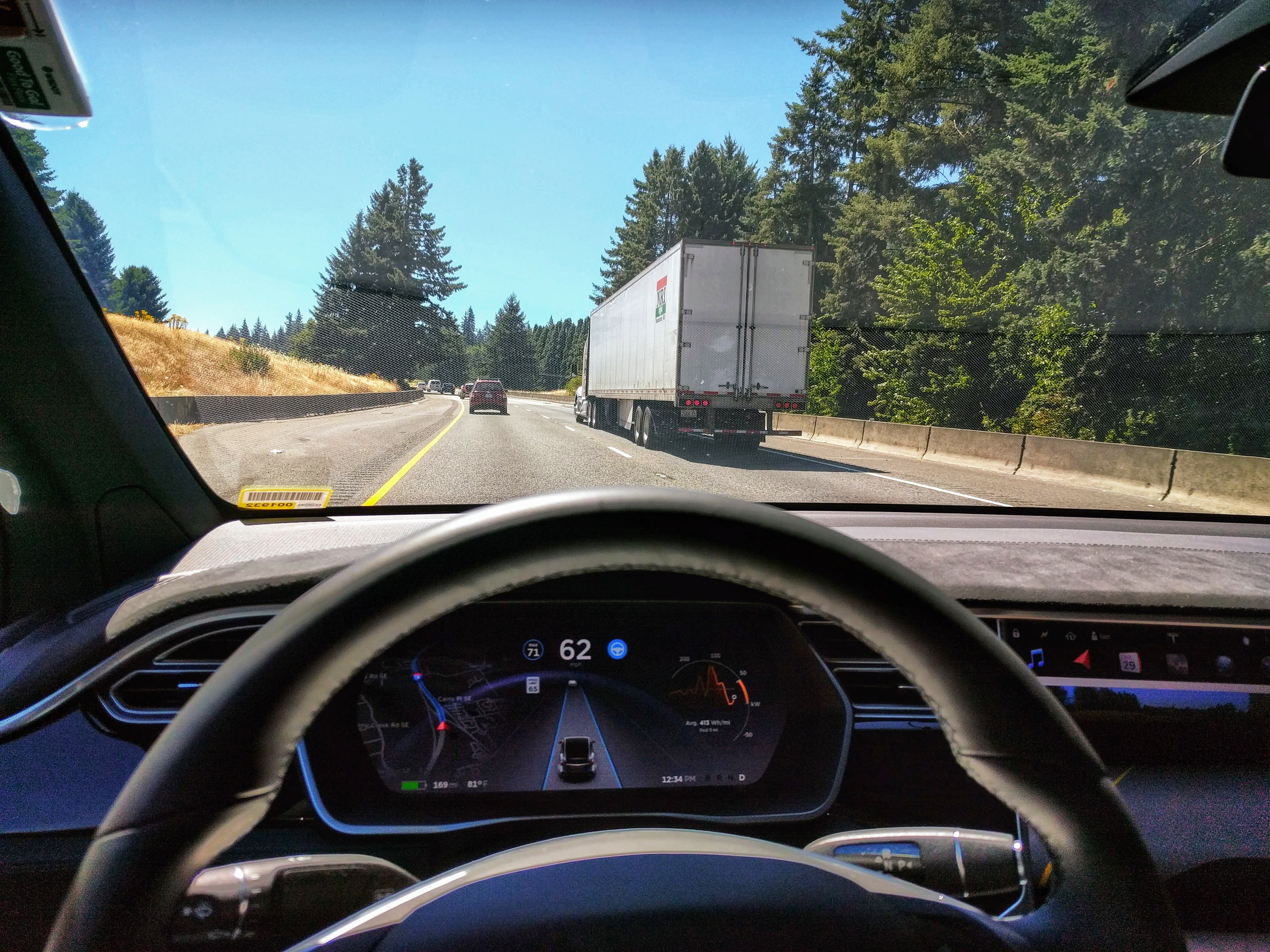
- Assisted control of distance from the leading car centering in lane enabled in a Tesla
- Industry: Automotive
- Application: Automobile
- Components: Sensors (typically cameras, proximity, and/or lidar), microprocessors, software, and actuators
- Examples: Adaptive cruise control Lane centering Hands-free driving

Advanced driver-assistance systems (ADAS) are technologies that assist drivers with the safe operation of a vehicle. Through a human-machine interface, ADAS increases car and road safety. ADAS uses automated technology, such as sensors and cameras, to detect nearby obstacles or driver errors and respond accordingly. ADAS can enable various levels of autonomous driving.

As most road crashes occur due to human error, ADAS are developed to automate, adapt, and enhance vehicle technology for safety and better driving. ADAS is proven to reduce road fatalities by minimizing human error. Safety features are designed to avoid crashes and collisions by offering technologies that alert the driver to problems, implementing safeguards, and taking control of the vehicle if necessary. ADAS may provide adaptive cruise control, assist in avoiding collisions, alert drivers to possible obstacles, warn of lane departure, assist in lane centering, incorporate satellite navigation, provide traffic warnings, provide navigational assistance through smartphones, automate lighting, or provide other features. According to the national crash database in the US, forward collision prevention systems have the potential to reduce crashes by 29%. Similarly, lane keeping assistance is shown to offer a reduction potential of 19%, while blind zone detection could decrease crash incidents by 9%.

According to a 2021 research report from Canalys, approximately 33% of new vehicles sold in the United States, Europe, Japan, and China had ADAS. The firm also predicted that 50% of all automobiles on the road by the year 2030 would be ADAS-enabled.

== Terminology ==
Some safety groups advocate standardization of the name, such as "forward collision warning" and "automatic emergency braking", rather than "forward collision alert" or "smart city brake support". These groups include AAA, Consumer Reports, J.D. Power, National Safety Council, PAVE, and SAE International.

== Concept, history and development ==
After WWII, an engineer named Nathaniel Korman, who worked on radar systems during WWII, experimented with a system to control the speed of a train based on the speed of a train in front of it, using radar. He noted that it could also be used for on-road vehicles.

In 1948, Ralph Teetor applied for a US patent in a "speed control device for resisting operation of the accelerator", or what is now known as cruise control, granted in 1950. General Motors later displayed a concept car in 1959, which used some variation of the system, with radar embedded in the front nacelles of the car.

ADAS were first used in production vehicles in the 1970s with the adoption of the anti-lock braking system. Early ADAS include electronic stability control, anti-lock brakes, blind spot information systems, lane departure warning, adaptive cruise control, and traction control. These systems can be affected by mechanical alignment adjustments or damage from a collision. This has led many manufacturers to require automatic resets for these systems after a mechanical alignment is performed.

=== Technical concepts ===
The reliance on data that describes the outside environment of the vehicle, compared to internal data, differentiates ADAS from driver-assistance systems (DAS). ADAS rely on inputs from multiple data sources, including automotive imaging, LiDAR, radar, image processing, computer vision, telemetry, and in-car networking. Additional inputs are possible from other sources separate from the primary vehicle platform, such as telematics data from other vehicles (vehicle-to-vehicle or V2V communication) and infrastructure (vehicle-to-infrastructure or V2I communication). Modern cars have ADAS integrated into their electronics; manufacturers can add these new features during the design process or after production via over-the-air (OTA) updates.

ADAS are considered real-time systems since they react quickly to multiple inputs and prioritize the incoming information to prevent crashes. The systems use preemptive priority scheduling to organize which task needs to be done first. The incorrect assignment of these priorities is what can cause more harm than good.

=== ADAS levels ===
The SAE classification of levels is based on the role of the driver, rather than the vehicle's capabilities, although these are related in the form of a "driving mode" (also known as a "driving scenario"). The mode is determined by both an operational design domain (ODD) and a "dynamic driving requirement". The ODD is the circumstance in which the car is driving, and the driving requirement is what the system must do while remaining safe within the boundaries of that ODD. These two things define the SAE level.

J3016 automation levels
Mode	Level	Summary	Description		Responsibility for		
Mode	Level	Summary	Description		Direction & speed	Monitoring environment	Fallback
N/A	0	No Automation	Full-time performance by the driver of all aspects of driving, even when "enhanced by warning or intervention systems"		Driver	Driver	Driver
Some	1	Driver assistance	Driving mode-specific control by an ADAS of either steering or speed	ADAS uses information about the driving environment; driver is expected to perform all other driving tasks.	Driver	Driver	Driver
Some	1	Driver assistance	Driving mode-specific control by an ADAS of either steering or speed	ADAS uses information about the driving environment; driver is expected to perform all other driving tasks.	System	Driver	Driver
Some	2	Partial automation	Driving mode-specific execution by one or more ADAS for both steering and speed	ADAS uses information about the driving environment; driver is expected to perform all other driving tasks.	System	Driver	Driver
Some	3	Conditional automation	Driving mode-specific control by an ADAS of all aspects of driving	Driver must appropriately respond to a request to intervene.	System	System	Driver
Many	4	High automation	Driving mode-specific control by an ADAS of all aspects of driving	If a driver does not respond appropriately to a request to intervene, the car can stop safely.	System	System	System
All	5	Full automation	Driving mode-specific control by an ADAS of all aspects of driving	System controls the vehicle under all conditions and circumstances.	System	System	System

=== Aftermarket ADAS ===
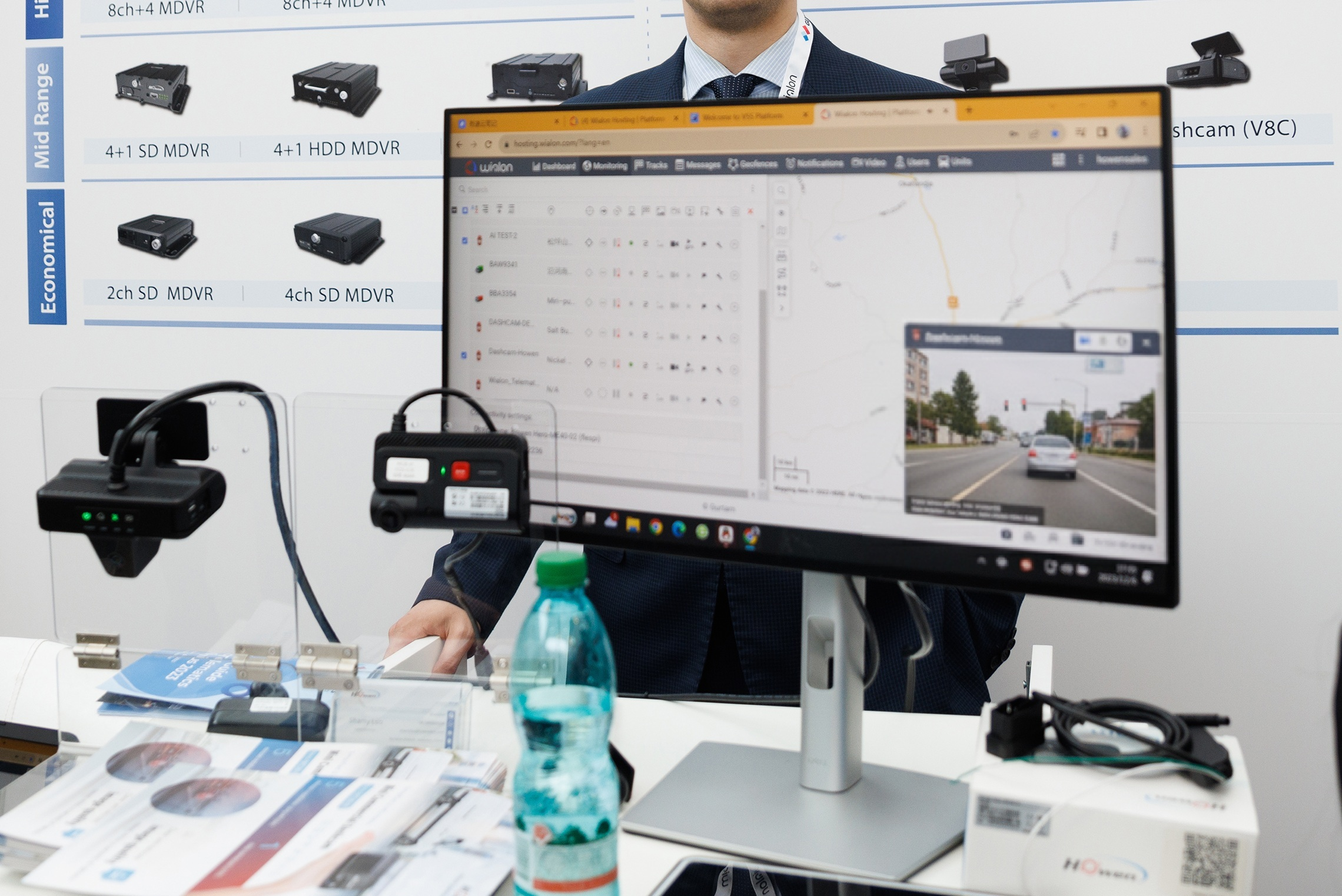
Video telematics devices and a software interface showing a map integrated with a video feed

While most ADAS features are installed by the vehicle manufacturer during production (OEM), there is a growing market for aftermarket systems that can be retrofitted to existing vehicles, particularly in commercial fleets. These systems are designed to provide key safety alerts and warnings to drivers of vehicles that were not originally equipped with ADAS.

The most common type of aftermarket ADAS is based on computer vision and utilizes a windshield-mounted camera. This device, which often combines the functionality of a dashcam with ADAS software, continuously scans the road ahead. Sometimes they are referred as AI Dashcams. They provide features such as:

- Forward Collision Warning (FCW)
- Lane Departure Warning (LDW)
- Pedestrian Collision Warning (PCW)

These systems are often a component of modern video telematics, as they not only provide safety alerts but also record video footage of the events. This data is then transmitted via a telematic control unit to a fleet management platform, where it can be used for driver coaching and incident analysis.

== Feature examples ==
This list is not a comprehensive list of all of the ADAS. Instead, it provides information on critical examples of ADAS that have progressed and become more commonly available since 2015.

=== Alerts and warnings ===
- Blind spot monitor involves cameras that monitor the driver's blind spots and notify the driver if any obstacles come close to the vehicle. Blind spots are defined as the areas behind or at the side of the vehicle that the driver cannot see from the driver's seat. Blind-spot monitoring systems typically work in conjunction with emergency braking systems to act accordingly if any obstacles come into the vehicle's path. A rear cross-traffic alert (RCTA) typically works in conjunction with the blind spot monitoring system, warning the driver of approaching cross traffic when reversing out of a parking spot.
- Driver drowsiness detection aims to prevent collisions due to driver fatigue. The vehicle obtains information, such as facial patterns, steering movement, driving habits, turn signal use, and driving velocity, to determine if the driver's activities correspond with drowsy driving. If drowsy driving is suspected, the vehicle will typically sound off a loud alert and may vibrate the driver's seat.
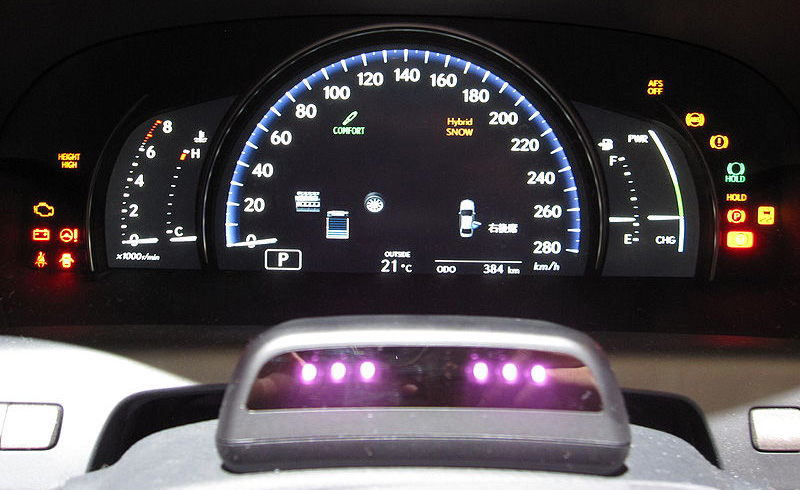
  Infrared LEDs for driver monitoring system illumination
- Driver monitoring system is designed to monitor the alertness of the driver. These systems use biological and performance measures to assess the driver's alertness and ability to conduct safe driving practices, which can be used for driver scoring. Currently, these systems use infrared sensors and cameras to monitor the driver's attentiveness through eye-tracking. If the vehicle detects a possible obstacle, it will notify the driver, and if no action is taken, the vehicle may react to the obstacle.
- Electric vehicle warning sounds notify pedestrians and cyclists that a hybrid or plug-in electric vehicle is nearby, typically delivered through a noise, such as a beep or horn. This technology was developed in response to the U.S. National Highway Traffic Safety Administration ruling that issued 50 percent of quiet vehicles must have a device implemented into their systems that sound off when the vehicle travels at speeds less than 30 km/h (18.6 mph) by September 2019.
- Forward collision warning (FCW) monitors the speed of the vehicle and, the vehicle in front of it, and the open distance around the vehicle. FCW systems will send an alert to the driver of a possible impending collision if gets too close to the vehicle in front of it. These systems do not take control of the vehicle, as currently, FCW systems only send an alert signal to the driver in the form of an audio alert, visual pop-up display, or other warning alert.
- Intelligent speed adaptation or intelligent speed advice (ISA) assists drivers with compliance with the speed limit. They take in information about the vehicle's position and notify the driver when they are not enforcing the speed limit. Some ISA systems allow the vehicle to adjust its speed to adhere to the relative speed limit. Other ISA systems only warn the driver when they are going over the speed limit and leave it up to the driver to enforce the speed limit or not.
- Intersection assistants use two radar sensors in the front bumper and sides of the car to monitor if there are any oncoming cars at intersections, highway exits, or car parks. This system alerts the driver of any upcoming traffic from the vehicle's sides. It can enact the vehicle's emergency braking system to prevent a collision.
- Lane departure warning system (LDW) alerts the driver when they partially merge into a lane without using their turn signals. An LDW system uses cameras to monitor lane markings to determine if the driver unintentionally begins to drift. This system does not take control of the vehicle to help sway the car back into the safety zone but instead sends an audio or visual alert to the driver.
- Parking sensors can scan the vehicle's surroundings for objects when the driver initiates parking. Audio warnings can notify the driver of the distance between the vehicle and its surrounding objects. Typically, the faster the audio warnings are issued, the closer the vehicle is getting to the object. These sensors may not detect objects closer to the ground, such as parking stops, which is why parking sensors typically work alongside backup cameras to assist the driver when reversing into a parking spot.
  TPMS low pressure warning icon
- Tire pressure monitoring determine when the tire pressure is outside the normal inflation pressure range. The driver can monitor the tire pressure and is notified when there is a sudden drop through a pictogram display, gauge, or low-pressure warning signal.
- Vibrating seat warnings alert the driver of danger. GM's Cadillacs have offered vibrating seat warnings since the 2013 Cadillac ATS. If the driver begins drifting out of the traveling lane of a highway, the seat vibrates in the direction of the drift, warning the driver of danger. The safety alert seat also provides a vibrating pulse on both sides of the seat when a frontal threat is detected.
- Wrong-way driving warning issue alerts to drivers when it is detected that they are on the wrong side of the road. Vehicles with this system enacted can use sensors and cameras to identify the direction of oncoming traffic flow. In conjunction with lane detection services, this system can also notify drivers when they partially merge into the wrong side of the road

=== Crash mitigation ===
- Pedestrian protection systems are designed to minimize the number of crashes or injuries that occur between a vehicle and a pedestrian. This system uses cameras and sensors to determine when the front of a vehicle strikes a pedestrian. When the collision occurs, the vehicle's bonnet lifts to provide a cushion between the vehicle's hard engine components and the pedestrian. This helps minimize the possibility of a severe head injury when the pedestrian's head comes into contact with the vehicle.

=== Driving task assistance ===
- Adaptive cruise control (ACC) can maintain a chosen velocity and distance between a vehicle and the vehicle ahead. ACC can automatically brake or accelerate with concern to the distance between the vehicle and the vehicle ahead. ACC systems with stop and go features can come to a complete stop and accelerate back to the specified speed. This system still requires an alert driver to take in their surroundings, as it only controls speed and the distance between you and the car in front of you.
  Symbol for ABS
- Anti-lock braking system (ABS) restores traction to a car's tires by regulating the brake pressure when the vehicle begins to skid. Alongside helping drivers in emergencies, such as when their car starts to skid on ice, ABS systems can also assist drivers who may lose control of their vehicle. With the growing popularity in the 1990s, ABS systems have become standard in vehicles.
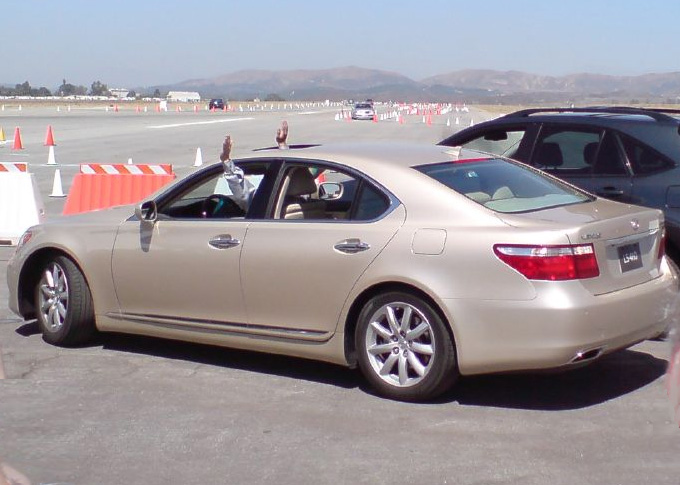
  Automatic parking, demonstrated by hands-off driver
- Automatic parking entirely takes over control of parking functions, including steering, braking, and acceleration, to assist drivers in parking. Depending on the relative cars and obstacles, the vehicle positions itself safely into the available parking spot. Currently, the driver must still be aware of the vehicle's surroundings and be willing to take control of it if necessary.
- Collision avoidance system (pre-crash system) uses small radar detectors, typically placed near the front of the car, to determine the car's vicinity to nearby obstacles and notify the driver of potential car crash situations. These systems can account for any sudden changes to the car's environment that may cause a collision. Systems can respond to a possible collision situation with multiple actions, such as sounding an alarm, tensing up passengers' seat belts, closing a sunroof, and raising reclined seats.
- Crosswind stabilization helps prevent a vehicle from overturning when strong winds hit its side by analyzing the vehicle's yaw rate, steering angle, lateral acceleration, and velocity sensors. This system distributes the wheel load in relation to the velocity and direction of the crosswind.
- Cruise control can maintain a specific speed pre-determined by the driver. The car will maintain the speed the driver sets until the driver hits the brake pedal, clutch pedal, or disengages the system. Specific cruise control systems can accelerate or decelerate, but require the driver to click a button and notify the car of the goal speed.
  ESC control light
- Electronic stability control (ESC) can reduce the speed of the car and activate individual brakes to prevent understeer and oversteer. Understeer occurs when the car's front wheels do not have enough traction to make the car turn and oversteer occurs when the vehicle turns more than intended, causing the vehicle to spin out. In conjunction with other car safety technologies, such as anti-lock braking and traction control, the ESC can safely help drivers maintain control of the car in unforeseen situations.
- Emergency driver assistant facilitates emergency counteract measures if the driver falls asleep or does not perform any driving action after a defined length of time. After a specified period, if the driver has not interacted with the accelerator, brake, or steering wheel, the car will send audio, visual, and physical signals to the driver. If the driver does not wake up after these signals, the system will stop, safely position the vehicle away from oncoming traffic, and turn on the hazard warning lights.
- Hill descent control helps drivers maintain a safe speed when driving down a hill or other decline. These systems are typically enacted if the vehicle moves faster than 15 to 20 mph when driving down. When a change in grade is sensed, hill descent control automates the driver's speed to descend down the steep grade safely. This system works by pulsing the braking system and controlling each wheel independently to maintain traction down the descent.
- Hill-start assist, also known as hill-start control or hill holder, helps prevent a vehicle from rolling backward down a hill when starting again from a stopped position. This feature holds the brake for you while you transition between the brake pedal and the gas pedal. For manual cars, this feature holds the brake for you while you transition between the brake pedal, the clutch, and the gas pedal.
- Lane centering assists the driver in keeping the vehicle centered in a lane. A lane-centering system may autonomously take over the steering when it determines the driver is at risk of deterring from the lane. This system uses cameras to monitor lane markings to stay within a safe distance between both sides of the lane.
- Lane change assistance helps the driver through the safe completion of a lane change by using sensors to scan the vehicle's surroundings and monitor the driver's blind spots. When a driver intends to make a lane change, the vehicle will notify the driver through an audio or visual alert when a vehicle is approaching from behind or is in the vehicle's blind spot. The visual alert may appear in the dashboard, heads-up-display, or the exterior rear-view mirrors. Several kinds of lane change assistance might exist, for instance, UNECE regulation 79 considers:
  - "ACSF (Automatically commanded steering function) of Category C" (...) a function which is initiated/activated by the driver and which can perform a single lateral manoeuvre (e.g., lane change) when commanded by the driver.
  - "ACSF of Category D" (...) a function which is initiated/activated by the driver and which can indicate the possibility of a single lateral manoeuvre (e.g. lane change) but performs that function only following a confirmation by the driver.
  - "ACSF of Category E" (...) a function which is initiated/activated by the driver and which can continuously determine the possibility of a manoeuvre (e.g. lane change) and complete these manoeuvres for extended periods without further driver command/confirmation.
- Rain sensors detect water and automatically trigger electrical actions, such as the raising of open windows and the closing of open convertible tops. A rain sensor can also take in the frequency of rain droplets to automatically trigger windshield wipers with an accurate speed for the corresponding rainfall.
- Traction control system (TCS) helps prevent traction loss in vehicles and prevent vehicle turnover on sharp curves and turns. By limiting tire slip, or when the force on a tire exceeds the tire's traction, this limits power delivery and helps the driver accelerate the car without losing control. These systems use the same wheel-speed sensors as the antilock braking systems. Individual wheel braking systems are deployed through TCS to control when one tire spins faster than the others.

=== Visual and environmental monitoring ===
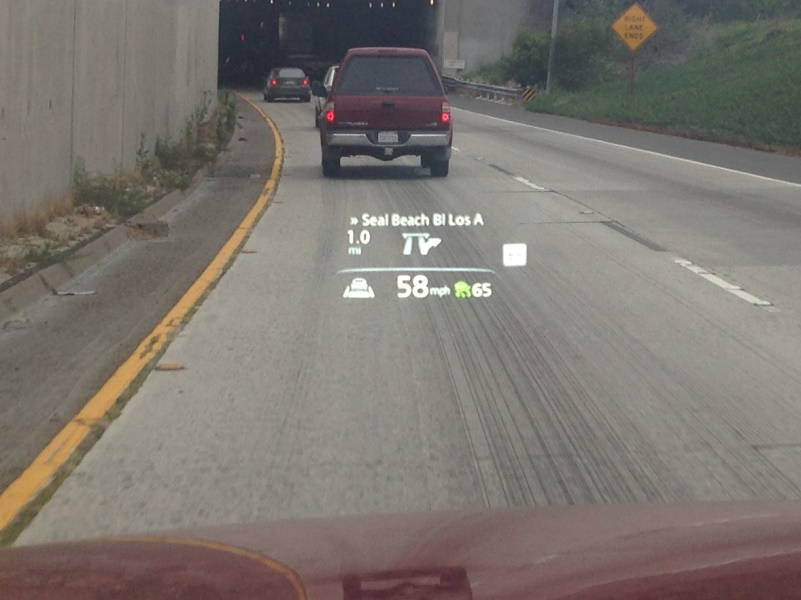
Auto-HUD displayed on windshield

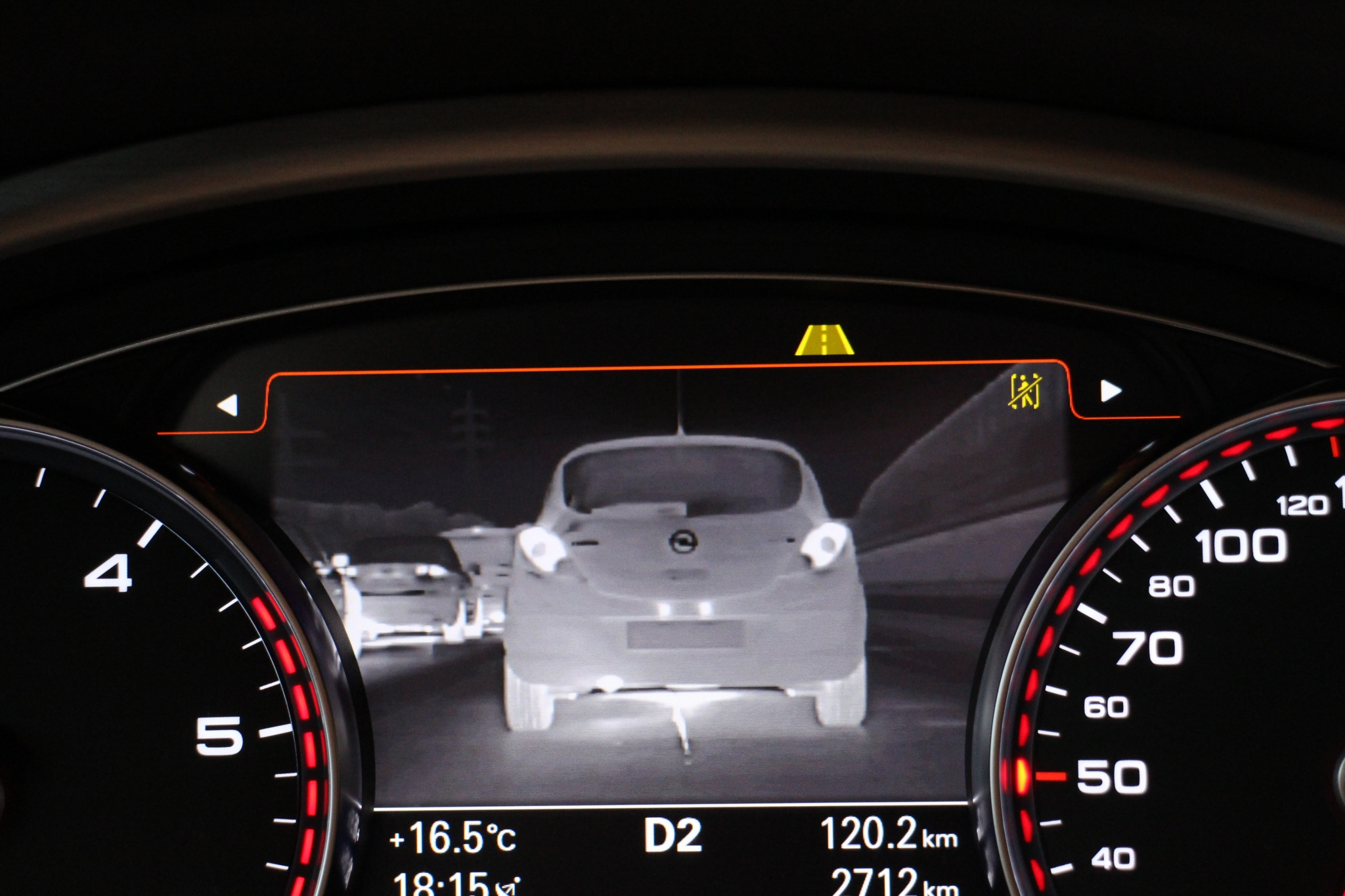
Automotive night vision display

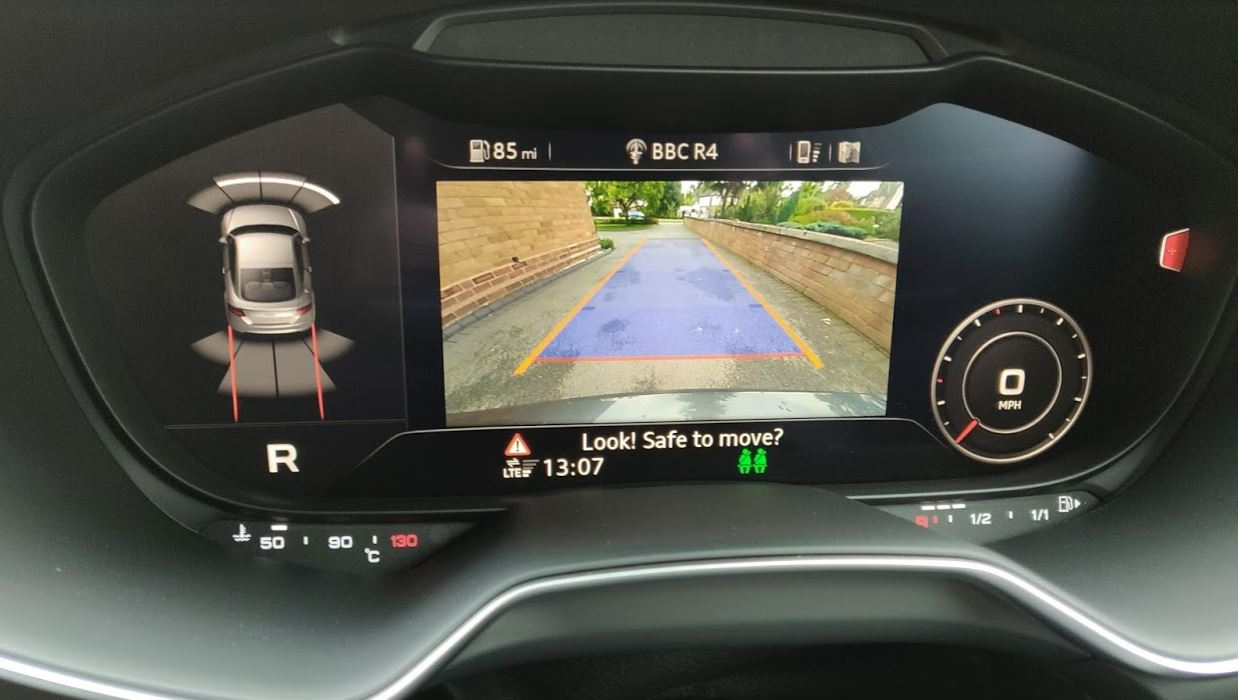
Backup camera displayed in digital instrument panel
- Automotive head-up display (auto-HUD) safely displays essential system information to a driver at a vantage point that does not require the driver to look down or away from the road. Currently, the majority of the auto-HUD systems on the market display system information on a windshield using LCDs.
- Automotive navigation system uses digital mapping tools, such as the global positioning system (GPS) and traffic message channel (TMC), to provide drivers with up-to-date traffic and navigation information. Through an embedded receiver, an automotive navigation system can send and receive data signals transmitted from satellites regarding the current position of the vehicle in relation to its surroundings.
- Automotive night vision systems enable the vehicle to detect obstacles, including pedestrians, in a nighttime setting or heavy weather situation when the driver has low visibility. These systems can use various technologies, including infrared sensors, GPS, Lidar, and Radar, to detect pedestrians and non-human obstacles.
- Backup camera provides real-time video information regarding the location of your vehicle and its surroundings. This camera offers driver's aid when backing up by providing a viewpoint that is typically a blind spot in traditional cars. When the driver puts the car in reverse, the camera automatically turns on.
- Glare-free high beam use Light Emitting Diodes, more commonly known as LEDs, to cut two or more cars from the light distribution. This allows oncoming vehicles coming in the opposite direction not to be affected by the light of the high-beams. In 2010, the VW Touareg introduced the first glare-free high beam headlamp system, which used a mechanical shutter to cut light from hitting specific traffic participants.
- Omniview technology improves a driver's visibility by offering a 360-degree viewing system. This system can accurately provide 3D peripheral images of the car's surroundings through a video telematics display outputted to the driver. Currently, commercial systems can only provide 2D images of the driver's surroundings. Omniview technology uses the input of four cameras and a bird's eye technology to provide a composite 3D model of the surroundings.
- Traffic sign recognition (TSR) systems can recognize common traffic signs, such as a "stop" sign or a "turn ahead" sign, through image processing techniques. This system takes into account the sign's shape, such as hexagons and rectangles, and the color to classify what the sign is communicating to the driver. Since most systems currently use camera-based technology, a wide variety of factors can make the system less accurate. These include poor lighting conditions, extreme weather conditions, and partial obstruction of the sign.
- Vehicular communication systems come in three forms: vehicle-to-vehicle (V2V), vehicle-to-infrastructure (V2I), and vehicle-to-everything (V2X). V2V systems allow vehicles to exchange information with each other about their current position and upcoming hazards. V2I systems occur when the vehicle exchanges information with nearby infrastructure elements, such as street signs. V2X systems occur when the vehicle monitors its environment and takes in information about possible obstacles or pedestrians in its path.

=== Hands-off systems ===
Ford and General Motors provide "hands-off, eyes-on" systems such as Blue Cruise and Super Cruise in North America. These systems allow drivers to take their hands off the steering wheel while the system is engaged. However, drivers must keep their eyes on the road and be ready to take immediate action at all times.

Vehicle miles traveled (VMT) by customers with Level 2
Brand	Vehicle number	ADAS suite name	VMT (hands-free)	Traveled distance (miles)
Ford	225,000	BlueCruise	100 million	150 million
General Motors	80,000	Super Cruise	77 million	~100 millions

== Adoption ==
View source data.

In Europe, in Q2 2018, 3% of sold passenger cars had Level 2 autonomy driving features. In Europe, in Q2 2019, 325,000 passenger cars are sold with Level 2 autonomy driving features, that is 8% of all new cars sold.

According to a 2021 research report from Canalys, approximately 33 percent of new vehicles sold in the United States, Europe, Japan, and China had ADAS features. The firm also predicted that fifty percent of all automobiles on the road by the year 2030 would be ADAS-enabled.

=== Branding ===
Major car brands with Level 2 features include Lexus, Audi, BMW, Mercedes-Benz, Tesla, Volvo, Tata, Citroën, Ford, Hyundai, Kia, Mazda, Nissan, Peugeot, Mahindra and Subaru. Full Level 2 features are included with Full Self-Driving from Tesla, Pilot Assist from Volvo, OpenPilot from Comma.ai and ProPILOT Assist from Nissan.

Level 3 features are included in Honda Sensing Elite from Honda and Drive Pilot from Mercedes-Benz.

=== Crash statistics ===
On June 29, 2021, the National Highway Traffic Safety Administration (NHTSA), the branch of the United States Department of Transportation responsible for federal motor vehicle regulations, issued Standing General Order 2021-01 (SGO 2021-01), which required manufacturers of ADAS (Levels 1 or 2) and Automated Driving Systems (ADS) (Levels 3 through 5) to promptly report crashes that occurred when driver-assistance or automation systems were in use. SGO 2021-01 subsequently was amended on August 5, 2021. Under the amended SGO 2021-01, a crash involving ADS or Level 2 ADAS is reportable to the NHTSA if it meets the following criteria:

- it happened on a publicly accessible road in the United States
- the Levels 3–5 ADS or Level 2 ADAS was engaged at any time within 30 seconds before the start of the crash through the conclusion of the crash

A severe crash is one that results in one or more of the following:

- transport to a hospital for medical treatment or a fatality, regardless of whether that person was an occupant of the vehicle equipped with the ADS or L2 ADAS
- a vehicle tow-away or an air bag deployment, regardless of whether that is the vehicle equipped with the ADS or L2 ADAS
- involves a vulnerable road user (anyone who is not an occupant of a motor vehicle with more than three wheels: typically pedestrians, wheelchair users, motorcyclists, or bicyclists), regardless of that vulnerable road user's influence on the cause of the crash

The incident report to the NHTSA must be made according to the following schedule:

- Severe crashes must be reported within one calendar day after the manufacturer receives notice the crash has occurred. In addition, an updated crash incident report must be made within ten calendar days after the manufacturer receives notice the crash has occurred.
- Otherwise, non-severe crashes involving ADS (excluding L2 ADAS) must be reported on the fifteenth day of the month following the calendar month in which the manufacturer receives notice the crash has occurred.

SGO 2021-01 is in effect for three years, starting on June 29, 2021. After gathering data for almost a year (July 1, 2021 through May 15, 2022), the NHTSA released the initial set of data in June 2022 and stated they plan to update the data on a monthly basis. The data are subject to several caveats and limitations; for instance, manufacturers are not required to report the number of vehicles that have been built and equipped with ADS/ADAS, the number of vehicles operating with ADS/ADAS, or the total distance traveled with ADS/ADAS active, which would be helpful to normalize the incident report data.

According to the initial data covering July 2021 to May 15, 2022, ADS (Levels 3–5) from 25 different manufacturers were involved in 130 crashes, led by Waymo LLC (62), Transdev Alternative Services (34), Cruise LLC (23), General Motors (16), and Argo AI (10); because multiple manufacturers can report the same crash, the sum exceeds the total number of reportable incidents. Of the 130 crashes, 108 had no associated injuries reported; there was only one serious injury associated with the remaining crashes. The most commonly-reported damage location was the rear of the ADS-equipped vehicle.

Similarly, ADAS (Level 2) from 12 different manufacturers were involved in 367 crashes over the same period; 392 crashes were reported in total, but 25 either occurred before July 2021 or had no associated date. Reported incidents were led by Tesla (273), Honda (90), and Subaru (10). Of the 392 crashes, 98 included injury reporting; of the 98, 46 had no injuries reported, 5 resulted in serious injuries and 6 resulted in fatalities. The most commonly-reported damage location was the front of the ADAS-equipped vehicle.

== Potential issues and concerns ==
=== Need for standardization ===
According to PACTS, lack of full standardization may make ADAS in different cars difficult for drivers to understand. Button names and locations, as well as dashboard symbols, change from car to car due to lack of standardization.

We can't help feeling that this lack of standardisation is one of the more problematic aspects of driver-assistance systems; and it's one that is likely to be felt more keenly as systems become increasingly commonplace in years to come, particularly if traffic laws change to allow 'hands-off' driving in the future.

— EuroNCAP

ADAS might have many limitations, for instance a pre-collision system might have 12 pages to explain 23 exceptions where ADAS may operate when not needed and 30 exceptions where ADAS may not operate when a collision is likely.

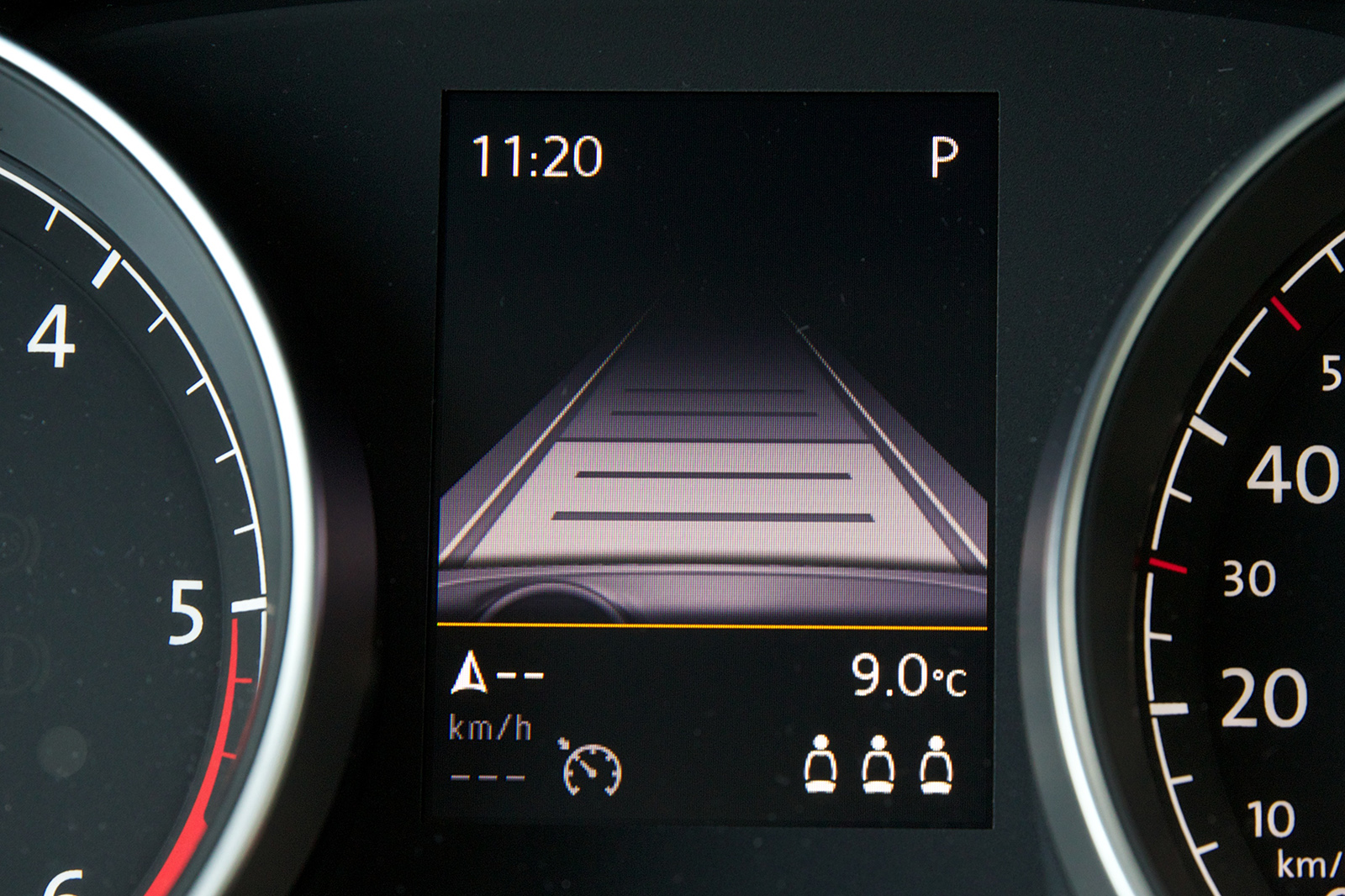
Adaptive cruise control display in the instrument panel of a Volkswagen Golf (Mk7)

Names for ADAS features are not standardized. For instance, adaptive cruise control is called Adaptive Cruise Control by Fiat, Ford, GM, VW, Volvo and Peugeot, but Intelligent Cruise Control by Nissan, Active Cruise Control by Citroen and BMW, and DISTRONIC by Mercedes. To help with standardization, SAE International has endorsed a series of recommendations for generic ADAS terminology for car manufacturers, created with Consumer Reports, the American Automobile Association, J.D. Power, and the National Safety Council.

ADAS behavior might change from car to car as well; for instance, ACC speed might be temporarily overridden in most cars, while some switch to standby after one minute.

=== Insurance and economic impact ===
The AV industry is growing exponentially, and according to a report by Market Research Future, the market is expected to hit over $65 billion by 2027. AV insurance and rising competition are expected to fuel that growth. Auto insurance for ADAS has directly affected the global economy, and many questions have arisen within the general public. ADAS allow autonomous vehicles to enable self-driving features, but there are associated risks with ADAS. AV companies and manufacturers are recommended to have insurance in the following areas in order to avoid any serious litigations. Depending on the level, ranging from 0 to 5, each car manufacturer would find it in its best interest to find the right combination of different insurances to best match their products. Note that this list is not exhaustive and may be constantly updated with more types of insurances and risks in the years to come.

- Technology errors and omissions – This insurance will cover any physical risk if the technology itself has failed. These usually include all of the associated expenses of a car crash.
- Auto liability and physical damage – This insurance covers third-party injuries and technology damage.
- Cyber liability – This insurance will protect companies from any lawsuits from third parties and penalties from regulators regarding cybersecurity.
- Directors and officers – This insurance protects a company's balance sheet and assets by protecting the company from bad management or misappropriation of assets.

With the technology embedded in autonomous vehicles, these self-driving cars are able to distribute data if a car crash occurs. This, in turn, will invigorate the claims administration and their operations. Fraud reduction will also disable any fraudulent staging of car crashes by recording the car's monitoring of every minute on the road. ADAS are expected to streamline the insurance industry and its economic efficiency with capable technology to fight off fraudulent human behavior. In September 2016, the NHTSA published the Federal Automated Vehicles Policy, which describes the U.S. Department of Transportation's policies related to highly automated vehicles (HAV) which range from vehicles with ADAS features to autonomous vehicles.

=== Ethical issues and current solutions ===
In March 2014, the US Department of Transportation's National Highway Traffic Safety Administration (NHTSA) announced that it will require all new vehicles under 10,000 pounds (4,500 kg) to have rear view cameras by May 2018. The rule was required by Congress as part of the Cameron Gulbransen Kids Transportation Safety Act of 2007. The Act is named after two-year-old Cameron Gulbransen. Cameron's father backed up his SUV over him, when he did not see the toddler in the family's driveway

The advancement of autonomous driving is accompanied by ethical concerns. The earliest moral issue associated with autonomous driving can be dated back to as early as the age of the trolleys. The trolley problem is one of the most well-known ethical issues. Introduced by English philosopher Philippa Foot in 1967, the trolley problem asks that under a situation which the trolley's brake does not work, and there are five people ahead of the trolley, the driver may go straight, killing the five persons ahead, or turn to the side track killing the one pedestrian, what should the driver do? Before the development of autonomous vehicles, the trolley problem remains an ethical dilemma between utilitarianism and deontological ethics. However, as the advancement in ADAS proceeds, the trolley problem becomes an issue that needs to be addressed by the programming of self-driving cars. The crashes that autonomous vehicles might face could be very similar to those depicted in the trolley problem. Although ADAS make vehicles generally safer than only human-driven cars, crashes are unavoidable. This raises questions such as "whose lives should be prioritized in the event of an inevitable crash?" Or "What should be the universal principle for these 'crash-algorithms'?"

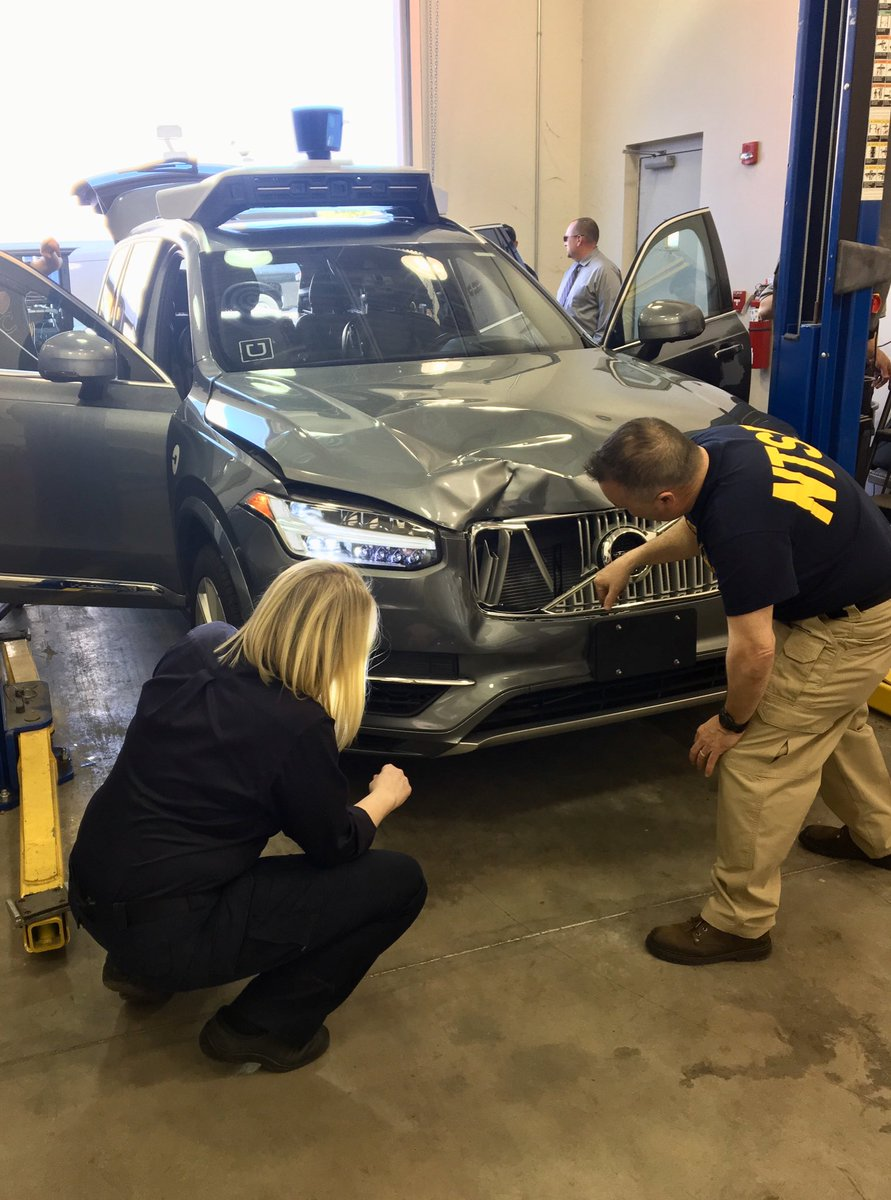
NTSB investigators examine the Volvo XC90 operated by Uber that struck and killed Elaine Herzberg (2018).

Many researchers have been working on ways to address the ethical concerns associated with ADAS. For instance, the artificial intelligence approach allows computers to learn human ethics by feeding them data regarding human actions. Such a method is useful when the rules cannot be articulated because the computer can learn and identify the ethical elements on its own without precisely programming whether an action is ethical. However, there are limitations to this approach. For example, many human actions are done out of self-preservation instincts, which is realistic but not ethical; feeding such data to the computer cannot guarantee that the computer captures the ideal behavior. Furthermore, the data fed to an artificial intelligence must be carefully selected to avoid producing undesired outcomes.

Another notable method is a three-phase approach proposed by Noah J. Goodall. This approach first necessitates a system established with the agreement of car manufacturers, transportation engineers, lawyers, and ethicists, and should be set transparently. The second phase is letting artificial intelligence learn human ethics while being bound by the system established in phase one. Lastly, the system should provide constant feedback that is understandable by humans.

== Ratings ==
=== Consumer Reports ===
In October 2023, Consumer Reports rated 17 "active driving assistance systems". Their criteria were:

- Capabilities and performance
- Clear when safe to use
- Ease of use
- Keeping the driver engaged
- Unresponsive driver

Their ratings were:

Rating	Manufacturer	System
84	Ford/Lincoln	BlueCruise
75	Chevrolet/GMC/Cadillac	Super Cruise
72	Mercedes-Benz	Driver Assistance
69	BMW	Driving Assistance Professional
65	Lexus/Toyota	Safety System+ 3.0/Safety Sense 3.0
63	Nissan/Infiniti	ProPILOT Assist 2.0
62	Volkswagen/Audi	Travel Assist/Adaptive Cruise Assist with lane guidance
61	Tesla	Autopilot
59	Lucid	Highway Assist
59	Rivian	Highway Assist
59	Hyundai/Kia/Genesis	Highway Driving Assist 2
59	Subaru	Advanced Adaptive Cruise Control with Lane Centering Assist
58	Nissan/Infiniti	ProPILOT Assist
58	Honda/Acura	Sensing/AcuraWatch
53	Jaguar/Land Rover	Adaptive Cruise w/Steer Assist
53	Volvo/Polestar	Pilot Assist
47	Hyundai/Kia/Genesis	Highway Driving Assist

=== Insurance Institute for Highway Safety ===
In March 2024, the American Insurance Institute for Highway Safety (IIHS) reported its first "partial automation safeguard ratings". Their criteria were:

- Adaptive cruise control does not automatically resume after a lengthy stop or if the driver is not looking at the road
- Automated lane changes must be initiated or confirmed by the driver
- Automation features cannot be used with seat belt unfastened
- Automation features cannot be used with automatic emergency braking or lane departure prevention/warning disabled
- Fail-safe procedure slows vehicle, notifies manufacturer and keeps automation off limits for remainder of drive
- Lane centering does not discourage steering by driver
- Monitors both the driver's gaze and hand position
- Uses multiple types of rapidly escalating alerts to get driver's attention

The ratings were (no system received a "good" rating):

Rating	Manufacturer	System
Acceptable	Lexus	Teammate with Advanced Drive
Marginal	General Motors	Super Cruise
Marginal	Nissan	ProPILOT Assist with Navi-link
Poor	BMW	Active Driving Assistant Pro
Poor	Ford	BlueCruise
Poor	Ford	Adaptive Cruise Control with Stop & Go and Lane Centering Assist
Poor	Genesis	Highway Driving Assist 2
Poor	Genesis	Smart Cruise Control/Lane Following Assist
Poor	Lexus	Dynamic Radar Cruise Control with Lane Tracing Assist
Poor	Mercedes-Benz	Active Distance Assist DISTRONIC with Active Steering Assist
Poor	Nissan	ProPILOT Assist 2.0
Poor	Tesla	Autopilot, Version 2023.7.10
Poor	Tesla	Full Self-Driving (Beta), Version 2023.7.10
Poor	Volvo	Pilot Assist

== Future ==
Intelligent transportation systems (ITS) highly resemble ADAS, but go beyond automatic traffic to include any enterprise that safely transports humans, such as public transport. With ITS, transportation technology is integrated with a city's infrastructure. This would then lead to a "smart city". These systems promote active safety by increasing the efficiency of roads, possibly by adding 22.5% capacity on average.

ADAS have aided in this increase in active safety, according to a study in 2008. ITS use a wide system of communication technology, including wireless technology and traditional technology, to enhance productivity.

A draft ADAS regulation named driver control assistance systems (DCAS) would allow hands-free driving with a possible risk of lack of attentiveness. Such DCAS regulation would allow system such as Tesla FSD in Europe. The UNECE driver control assistance systems regulation plan that DCAS shall be designed to ensure that the driver performs the driving task, that the driver's hands must remain on the wheel and that the system shall monitor the driver's visual engagement.

== See also ==
- Mobileye
- EuroFOT
- Road Safety
- Integrated Vehicle-Based Safety Systems
- Intelligent transportation system
- Hands-free driving
- Traffic psychology
- Automotive electronics
- Software Defined Vehicle (SDV)
