= Intersection assistant =

Intersection assistant is an advanced driver-assistance system first introduced in 2009.

City junctions are a major accident blackspot. These collisions can mostly be attributed to driver distraction or misjudgement. Whereas humans often react too slowly, assistance systems are immune to that brief moment of shock.

The system monitors cross traffic in an intersection/road junction. If this anticipatory system detects a hazardous situation of this type, it prompts the driver to start emergency braking by activating visual and acoustic warnings and automatically engaging brakes.

== Vehicles ==
- Toyota Crown Majesta (2009 onwards): Front-side Pre-crash Safety System
- Mercedes-Benz S-Class (W222), Mercedes-Benz E-Class (W212) (2013 onwards): BAS PLUS with Cross-Traffic Assist
- Volvo XC40
