= Emergency driver assistant =

Emergency Assist is a driver assistance system that monitors driver behavior by observing delays between the use of the accelerator and the brake; once a preset threshold of time has been exceeded the system will take control of the vehicle in order to bring it to a safe stop.

Emergency Assist combines several Level 1 self-driving car technologies, such as Adaptive Cruise Control, Side Assist, Lane Assist, and Park Assist to effectively achieve Level 3 operation, where the vehicle operates automatically when it infers that there is an emergency. Many vehicle manufacturers now offer an Emergency Driver Assistant feature on their more recent, high-end models, taking advantage of the standardization of low-level driver assistance systems in such models.

== Market penetration ==
=== EU market ===
Since 24 February 2011, all new vehicles (passenger car and light commercial) have to be equipped with brake assist systems (known as BAS) as standard in the European Union. Since 2015, advanced emergency braking systems (known as AEBS) in mandatory in the new heavy-duty vehicles in the EU. Regulation (EU) 2019/2144 plans to make advanced emergency braking (known as AEB) mandatory for all new cars.

=== Potential drawbacks ===
This technology does have potential drawbacks. Primarily, the success of the technology relies on a high market penetration rate; if it has low market penetration then it could potentially cause problems with drivers that are used to the presence of the technology not having it when they operate older vehicles. Additionally, there are driving environment situations in which the system would not be able to come to a safe stop, such as in dense traffic at high speed, and there is little information on how the system would handle this situation, especially given that prolonged operation would introduce too many variables for the system to compensate.

== Emergency stop signal ==
In the European Union, the emergency stop signal (ESS) or emergency braking display (EBD) is defined as a "signal to indicate to other road users to the rear of the vehicle that a high retardation force has been applied to the vehicle relative to the prevailing road conditions."

The emergency stop signal works with the simultaneous operation of all the stop or direction-indicator lamps flashing at a frequency of around 4 Hertz. In Australia and in the European Union, lamps of the emergency stop signal may emit amber or red light.

EU vehicles might have the emergency stop signal (ESS) and/or rear-end collision alert signal (RECAS) both defined by unece regulation #48 but this signal is optional.

== See also ==
- Emergency brake assist (increases braking in some circumstances, unece regulation 139)
- Autonomous emergency braking (initiates braking, unece regulation 131)
- Emergency steering function (unece regulation 79)
- eCall / Emergency response system (unece regulation 144)
