= EuroFOT =

euroFOT, European Field Operational Test, was a project of gathering naturalistic data to assess the impact from the usage of intelligent transportation systems called "intelligent vehicle systems" or "active safety systems" to evaluate their effect on transport safety and fuel efficiency. Led by Ford in partnership with 28 partners, including European vehicle manufacturers, the project involved test on 1000 vehicles during a one-year period. The project included 8 sites in Central Europe. During the active years 12 deliverables and a final report were released. More than 100 TB of data were gathered of use for future analysis and research.

The intelligent vehicle systems included tools to automatically adjust vehicle speed using headway sensor data, to alert the driver if a sensor detects an object with high probability of collision, to alert the driver when the car is not centered on its lane, and tools monitoring fuel usage. The study showed a decrease of safety risk up to 42% due to timely alert of the driver or an automatic adjustment of speed, and that over 90% of accidents involve driver behaviour as a contributing factor. The data included assessment of risk in different positions on the road relative to intersections and visibility.
