= IVBSS =

Test of crash avoidance systems

IVBSS (Integrated Vehicle-Based Safety Systems program) is a study led by University of Michigan Transportation Research Institute to test integrated crash avoidance system from 2007–2011. 16 passenger cars and 10 trucks participated in the study. The system warned against front crash risks, lateral crash risks, risks involved while moving between lanes and curve risks while turning. Driver behavior was recorded with and without the system.

American power management company Eaton Corporation provided radar-based technology and worked on its integration with the system.

== History ==
From November 2005 — April 2008, the first phase of the study was conducted, developing systems specification, design, and construction of prototype vehicles. In April 2008, the program was approved for field tests, which took place during February to December 2009. Con-way Freight sponsored and participated in the heavy trucks part of the field tests.

IVBSS won the Best of ITS Awards US national competition in 2008.

Test results indicated that drivers were ready to start using the system, with 72% indicating that they would like such systems in their personal vehicles, and found its blind spot component particularly relevant.
