= Headstock (rolling stock) =

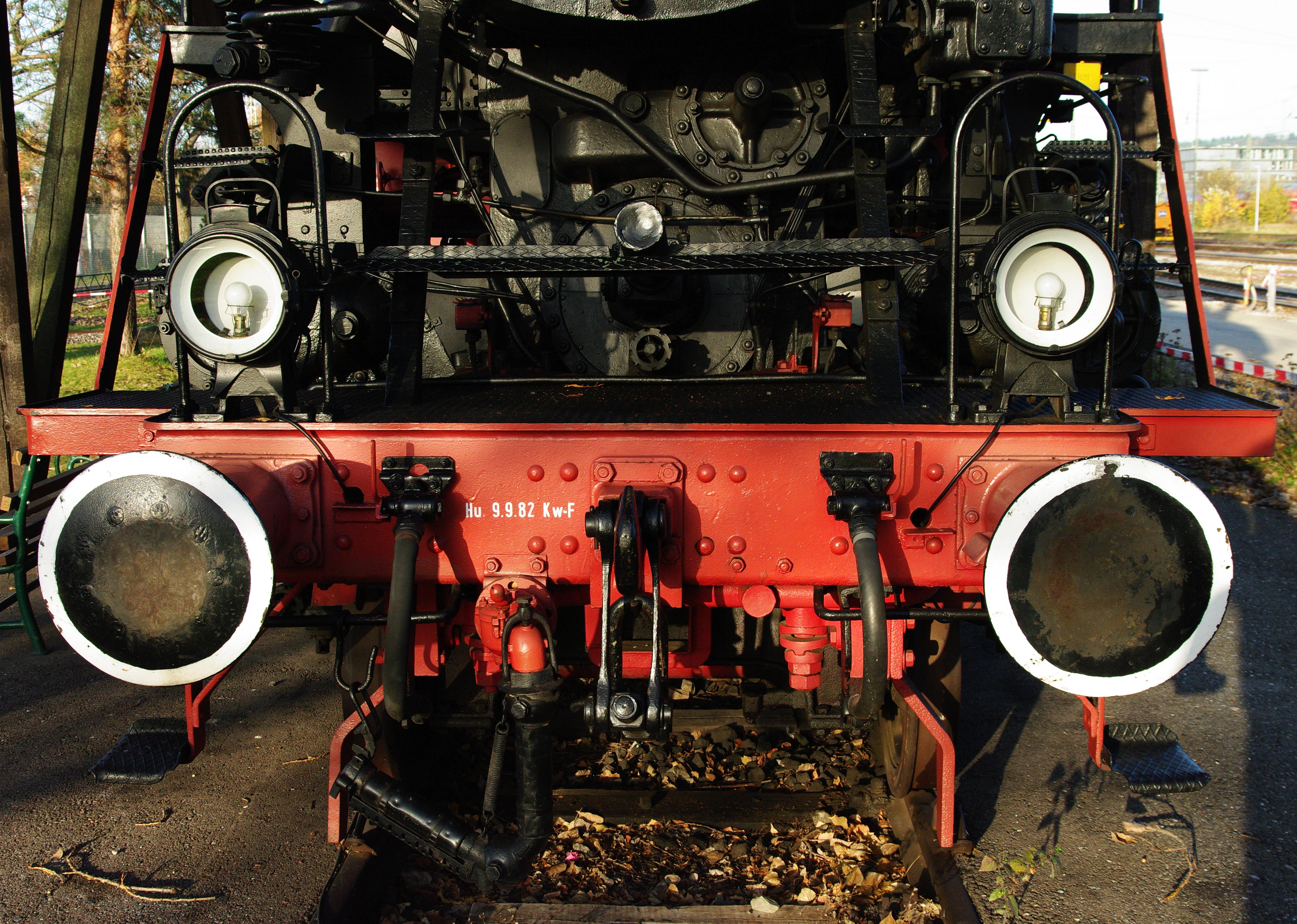
Buffer beam / headstock (painted red) fitted with buffers and chain coupler and air hoses on the front end of a German steam locomotive

Typical arrangement on the buffer beam of a British locomotive, early 20th century. From centre outwards: drawhook with screw coupling; vacuum brake standpipe (one side only); safety chains; guard irons; buffers.

A headstock of a rail vehicle is a transverse structural member located at the extreme end of the vehicle's underframe. The headstock supports the coupling at that end of the vehicle, and may also support buffers, in which case it may also be known as a buffer beam. The headstocks form part of the underframe of a locomotive or a railroad car. The headstocks of locomotives, railcars and cabcars also support headlamps and the hoses for air brakes, vacuum brakes as well as the cables for train control and head end power.

== Length over headstocks ==
A commonly used measurement relating to a rail vehicle is its length over headstocks, which is the length of the vehicle excluding its couplings or buffers (if any). Alternative expressions for length over headstocks are length over coupler pulling faces, usually applied to Janney couplers, and length over buffers.

== See also ==
- Anticlimber
- Buff strength
- Bumper
- Crashworthiness
- Glossary of rail transport terms
- Glossary of steam locomotive components
- Pilot (locomotive attachment) (cowcatcher)
