= Street-legal vehicle =

Motor vehicle approved for use on public roadways

Two images showing a Mazda 323F's headlights retracted and visible.

Street-legal, road-legal, or road-going, refers to a vehicle such as a car, motorcycle, or light truck that is equipped and licensed for use on public roads, being therefore roadworthy. This will require specific configurations of lighting, signal lights, and safety equipment. Some specialty vehicles that will not be operated on roads, therefore, do not need all the features of a street-legal vehicle; examples are a vehicle used only off-road (such as a sandrail) that is trailered to its off-road operating area, and a racing car that is used only on closed race tracks and therefore does not need all the features of a street-legal vehicle. As well as motor vehicles, the street-legal distinction applies in some jurisdictions to track bicycles that lack street-legal brakes and lights. Street-legality rules can even affect racing helmets, which possess visual fields too narrow for use on an open road without the risk of missing a fast-moving vehicle.

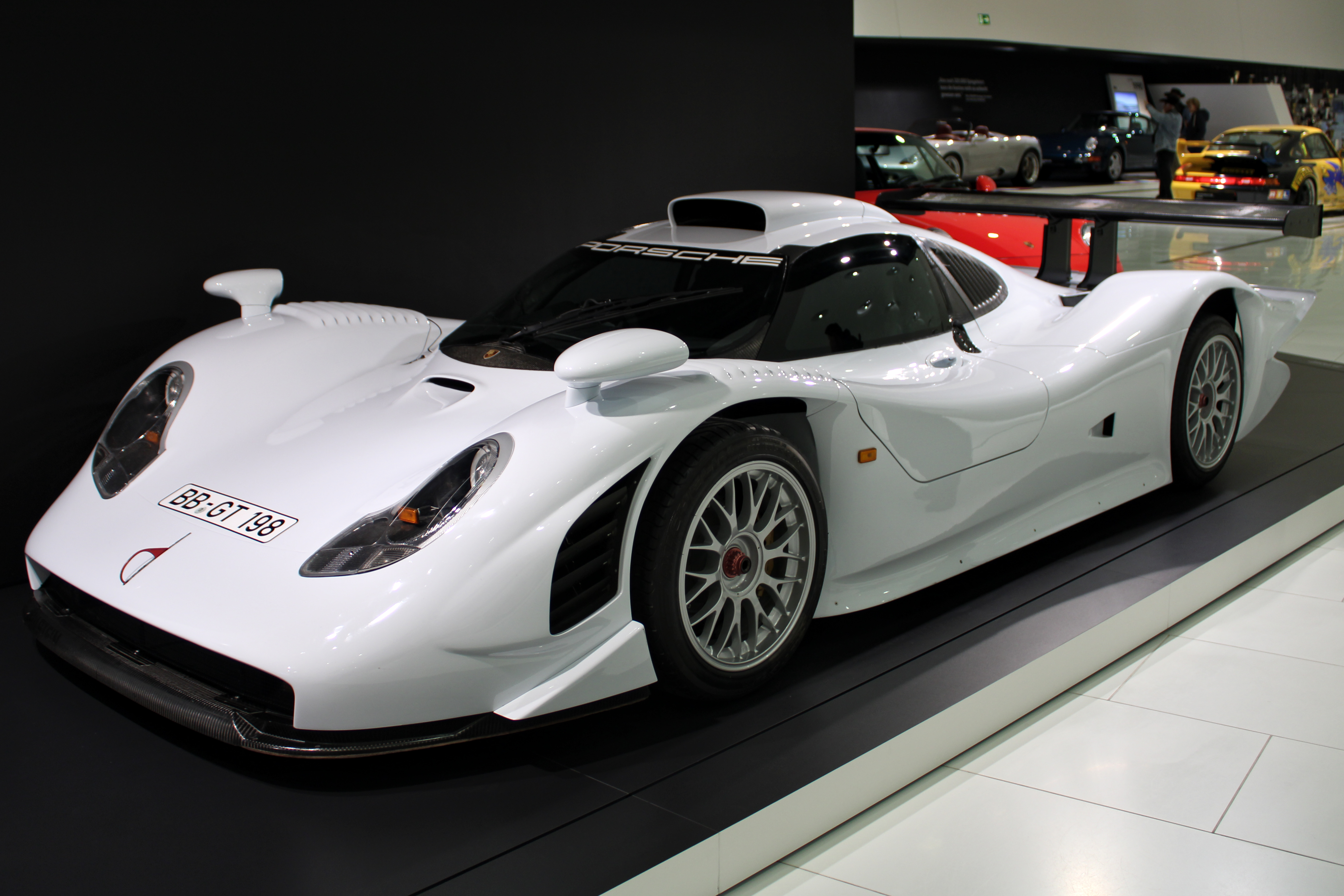
The Porsche 911 GT1 '98 "Straßenversion" (German: Roadworthy Version) is a street-legal racing car and a single copy of the racing version, that succeeded at the 24 Hours of Le Mans in 1998.

== Conditional ==
Some vehicles may be street-legal only in certain areas, routes or use cases, such as UTVs or tractors only allowed on-road in rural areas or driving between different off-road areas/private properties. Enduro dirt bikes on dirt/gravel roads in National parks for personal recreational use. Small engine motorcycle/moped or microcars/quadricycle only allowed on (low speed) streets and not (high speed) highways. Vehicles imported from another country for testing, display or remanufacturing. Rally cars or trophy trucks, immediately before, during and immediately after rallies.

== Canada ==
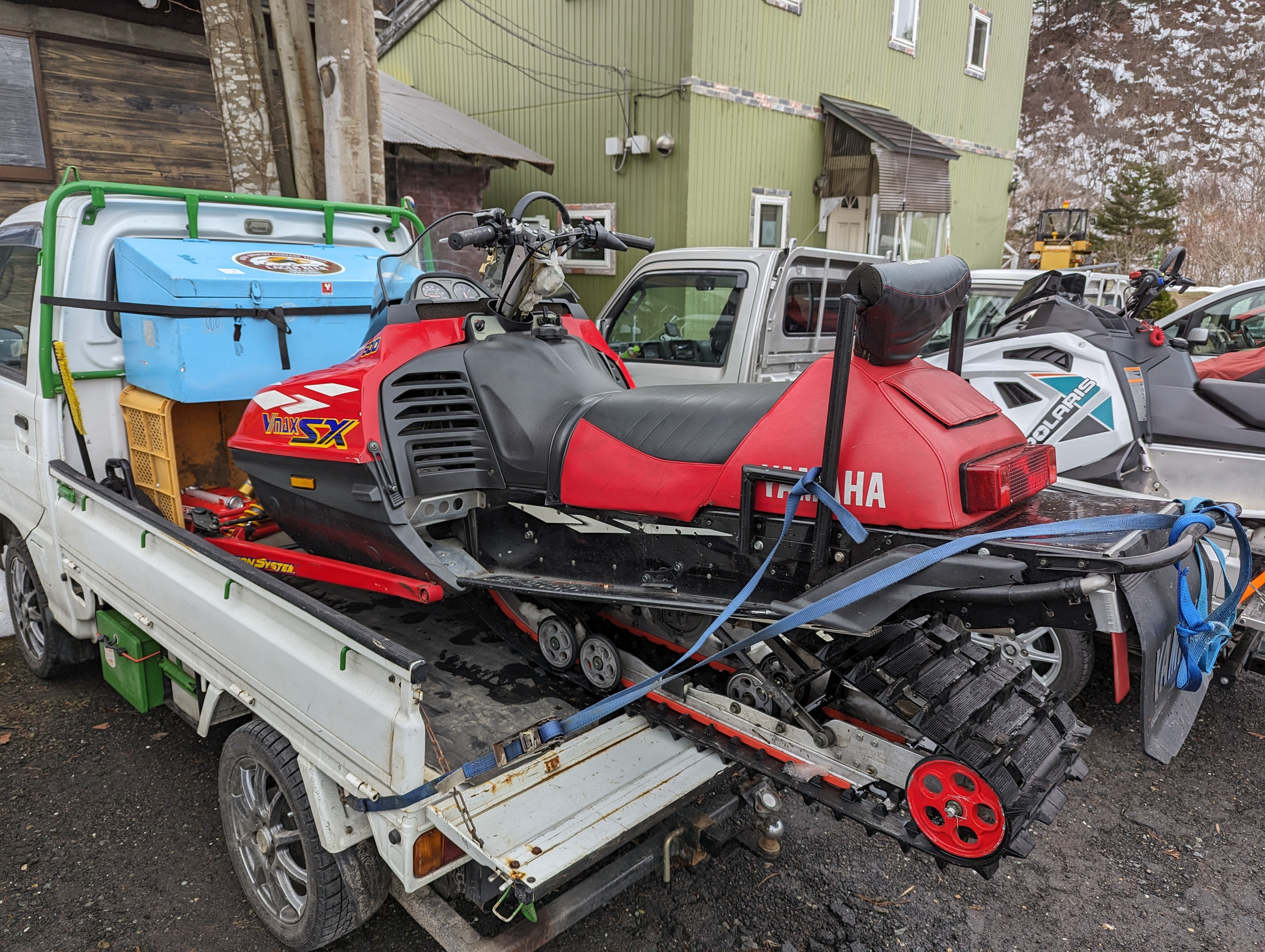
New kei trucks are illegal to drive on public roads in Canada

In Canada, all ten provinces follow a consistent set of national criteria issued by Transport Canada for specific equipment required as part of a street-legal vehicle. In some provinces, the Highway Traffic Act is a matter of provincial jurisdiction; provinces with such an Act include Ontario, Manitoba, and Newfoundland and Labrador.

Many but not all U.S.-model vehicles do qualify for import to Canada, but must meet requirements for items such as daytime running lights (standard on Canadian-market vehicles since 1991, but not required in the U.S.), anti-theft immobilisers, and anchorage points for child seats. Cars from other countries (such as the UK) typically do not qualify, as standards are too widely divergent from those in Canada.

== India ==
Requirements for manufacturing, registering, and operating motor vehicles in India are codified by the Central Motor Vehicles Rules (CMVR), as maintained by the Ministry of Road Transport and Highways. Street-legal two-, three-, and four-wheeled vehicles must comply with structure, safety equipment, and operating conditions in CMVR 93–125.

== United Kingdom ==
In the United Kingdom, vehicles must pass the Single Vehicle Approval (SVA) scheme, a pre-registration inspection for cars and light goods vehicles that have not been type-approved to British or European standards. Since August 2001, there have been two levels of SVA, those being 'standard' and 'enhanced'. The standard SVA is applied to vehicles such as left-hand drive vehicles, personally imported vehicles, amateur-built vehicles and armoured vehicles, to name a few. Vehicles which do not fall into one of the standard SVA categories – for example a vehicle of right-hand drive – require enhanced SVA in addition to standard SVA inspections.

The SVA is in the process of being replaced by the Individual Vehicle Approval (IVA).

== United States ==
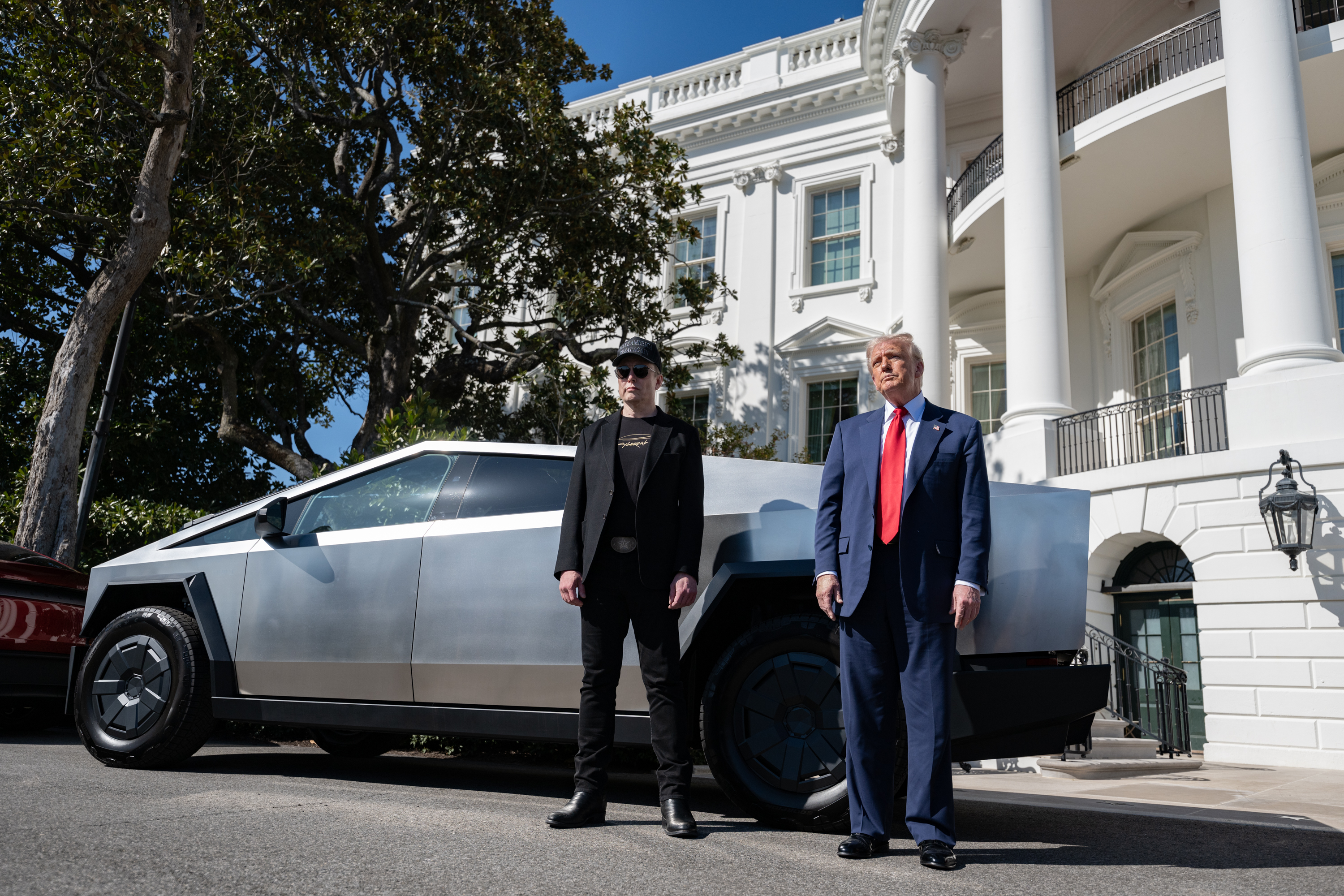
Tesla Cybertruck is not legal in Europe or China and exclusively sold in USA and Canada

In the United States, the individual states have the authority to determine, by means of statutes and regulations, which types of vehicles are permitted on public streets, as a function of police power. Vehicles that are considered street-legal in the U.S. include automobiles, trucks, and motorcycles. Some vehicles that are not generally sold for on-road driving – such as all-terrain vehicles (ATVs) and golf carts – can potentially be adapted for street use, if permitted by state law.

Most requirements for automobiles are largely consistent between U.S. states. A notable exception is California emission control, which has traditionally been more strict than that in other states. Common requirements for automobiles include structure (examples: hood) and safety equipment (examples: headlamps and bumpers).

Common requirements for motorcycles include side view mirrors and a dedicated seat in order to transport a passenger. However, states vary widely on other equipment such as turn signals.

== See also ==
- Roadworthiness
- Rolling coal
