= Buff strength =

Buff strength in the certification of railway rolling stock is the required resistance to deformation or permanent damage due to loads applied at the car's ends, such as in a collision. Particular emphasis on buff strength is placed in the United States, with buff strength requirements there being higher than in Europe.

== United States ==
Buff strength requirements grew out of best-practice design standards during the latter part of the nineteenth century. By the twentieth century, a design limit of 400,000 pounds-force (1.8 MN) was required by federal approval agencies. This was upped to 800,000 pounds-force (3.6 MN) for certain categories in 1945.

Federal requirements for buff strength were set in 1999 at 800,000 pounds-force (3.6 MN) for all passenger-carrying units, unless reduced by waivers or special order. The Federal Static and Strength Regulation (49 Code of Federal Regulations § 238.203) requires that a passenger rail car be able to support a longitudinal static compressive load of 400,000 pounds-force (1.8 MN) without permanent deformation.

There are other strength requirements associated with end-structure design. 49 CFR § 238.211 specifies that the cab ends of locomotives, cab cars, and self-powered multiple-unit cars have lead ends capable of supporting 500,000 pounds-force (2.2 MN) longitudinally at the top of the underframe, and 200,000 pounds-force (0.89 MN) above the top of the underframe.

== Europe ==
There are multiple certifying and approving agencies in Europe, so universal agreement on strength standards is not guaranteed. A 1977 German standard (VÖV 6.030.1/1977) presented values which have been followed by some other countries. The document was revised in 1992 and is presently known as VDV Recommendation 152 – Structural Requirements to Rail Vehicles for Public Mass Transit in Accordance with BOStrab.

In 1995, the European Common Market Committee for Standardization issued a draft document, Structural Requirements of Railway Vehicle Bodies. It mandated differing design loads for vehicles in differing categories, ranging from 45,000 pounds-force (0.20 MN) for tramways to 450,000 pounds-force (2.0 MN) for passenger coaches and locomotives.

In general the European approach to crashworthiness of passenger coaches puts more emphasis on crumple zones rather than buff strength, meaning that the required design loads are less than those in the United States. This is generally agreed to reduce construction costs.

== See also ==
- Compressive strength
- Container compression test
- Crashworthiness
- Deformation (engineering)
- Headstock (rolling stock)
- Railworthiness
