= Seakeeping =

Response of a vessel to sea conditions

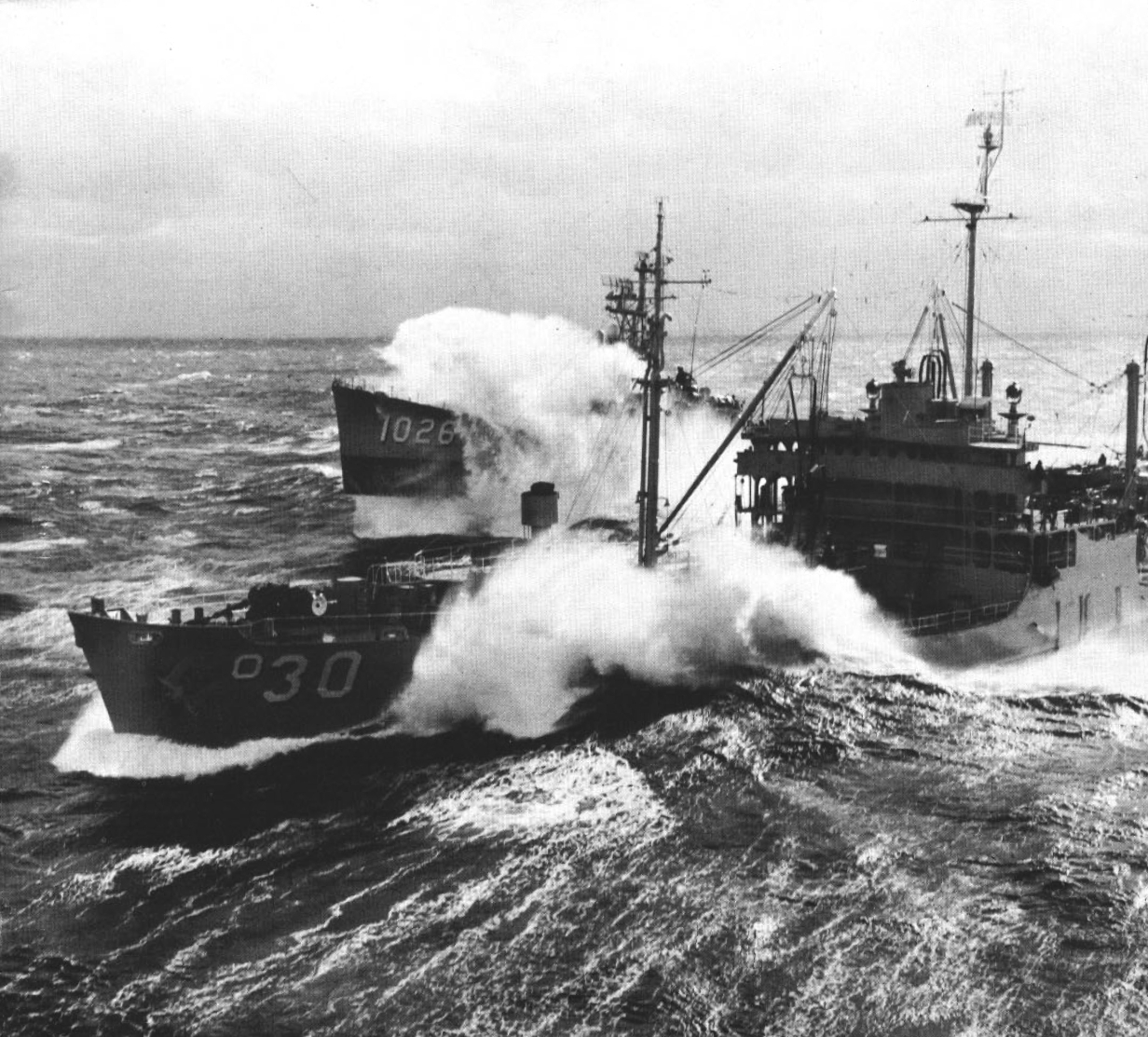
USS Chemung (AO-30) refueling USS Hooper in heavy seas

Seakeeping ability or seaworthiness is a measure of how well-suited a watercraft is to conditions when underway. A ship or boat which has good seakeeping ability is said to be very seaworthy and is able to operate effectively even in high sea states.

== Measure ==
In 1976, St. Denis suggested four principal terms needed to describe a seakeeping performance. These are:

- Mission: what the ship is intended to accomplish. The role of the ship while at sea.
- Environment: the conditions under which the ship is operating. This can be described as sea state, wind speed, geographic region or some combination thereof.
- Ship responses: the response of the ship to the environmental conditions. The responses are a function of the environment and the vessel characteristics.
- Seakeeping performance criteria: the established limits for the ship's responses. These are based on the ship motions and the accelerations experienced, and include comfort criteria such as noise, vibration and sea sickness, performance based values such as involuntary speed reduction, and observable phenomena such as bow immersion.

A drillship and a ferry have different missions and operate in different environments. The performance criteria will be different as well. Both may be considered seaworthy, although for different reasons based on different criteria.

== Background ==
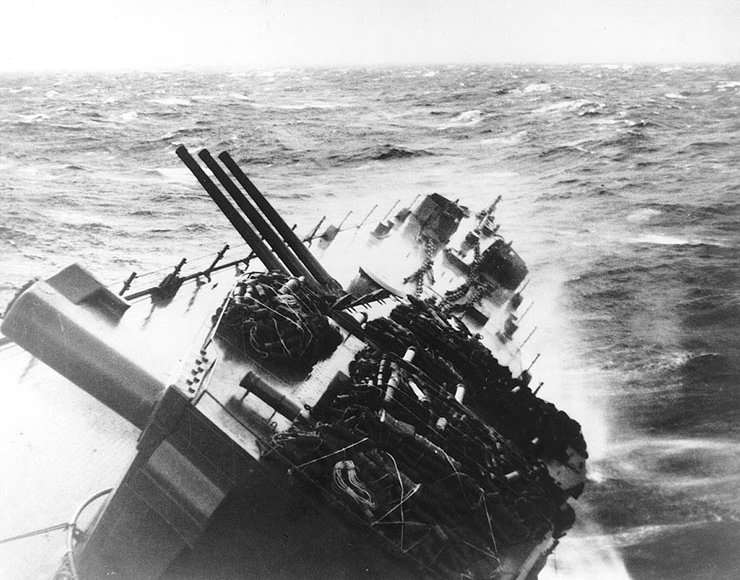
USS Santa Fe (CL-60) rolling about 35 degrees to starboard as she rides out a typhoon

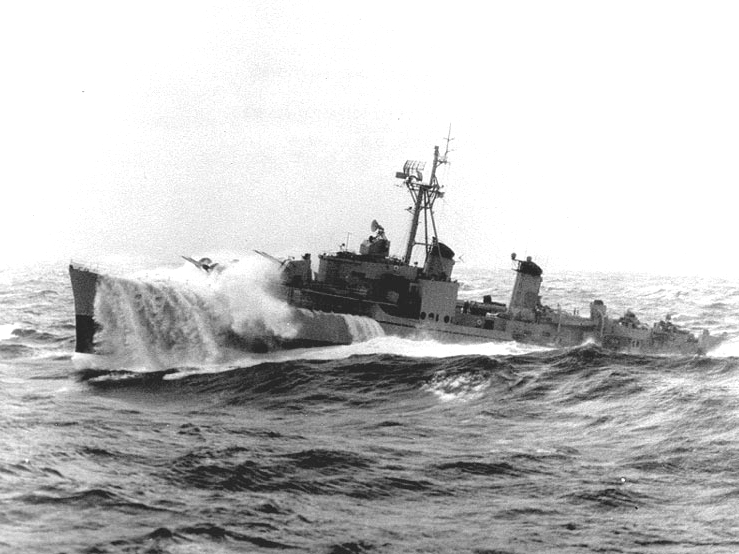
USS Waldron (DD-699) pitching her forefoot out of the water, while operating in heavy Atlantic seas

In ship design it is important to pre-determine the behavior of the ship or floating structure when it is subjected to waves. This can be calculated, found through physical model testing and ultimately measured on board the vessel. Calculations can be performed analytically for simple shapes like rectangular barges, but need to be calculated by computer for any realistic shaped ship. The results of some of these calculations or model tests are transfer functions called response amplitude operators (RAOs). For a floating structure they will need to be calculated for all six motions and for all relative wave headings.

Ship motions are important for determining dynamic loading on the crew, passengers, ship system components, secured cargo, and structural elements. Excessive ship motions may hinder the vessel's ability to complete its mission such as the deployment and recovery of small boats or aircraft. A measure of an individual's ability to complete a specific task while on board a moving ship is the motion-induced interruptions (MII). It gives an indication of the number of events in which a standing person will look for support in order to maintain balance. MII is measured in occurrences per hour.

Ship motions have physiological effects on ship passengers and crew. The magnitudes and accelerations of ship motions, (particularly heave, roll and pitch) have adverse effects on passengers and shipboard personnel. Sea sickness will have negative effects on the ability of crew to accomplish tasks and maintain alertness and will obviously distress passengers. An important metric in evaluating sea sickness is the motion sickness incidence (MSI). The most important study on MSI was published in Aerospace Medicine by O'Hanlon and McCauley in 1974, which established common subjective thresholds of MSI tolerance. MSI is measured in percentage of people who experience sea sickness during a given amount of exposure time. A commonly accepted limit of MSI is 20% occurrence of sea sickness over a four-hour exposure period. A small percentage of people are very susceptible to sea sickness and become ill even in the slightest conditions, while other people rarely get sea sick despite severe conditions. It has also been shown that most people acclimate to ship motions within a period of about four days, but some never acclimate at all.

Seakeeping directly impacts the design of a vessel. Ship motions are considered when determining the principal dimensions of the ship and in developing the general arrangements of the ship's internal spaces. For example, in most vessels the far forward parts of the ship experience the worst ship motions and are commonly unacceptable for berthing passengers or crew. In exceptional cases where ship motions pose a threat to crew, structure or machinery, or when ship motions interfere with the ability of the ship to accomplish its mission, then the design must be modified so that ship motions are reduced.

=== Mathematical description ===
In linear seakeeping theory, the motion of a vessel in small-amplitude waves is often modeled using potential flow. The surrounding fluid is treated as incompressible and irrotational, so the velocity field is written as the gradient of a velocity potential, and the potential satisfies Laplace's equation in the fluid domain. For a regular Airy wave, the free-surface elevation may be written

$$\eta(x,t)=a\cos(kx-\omega t)$$

where $a$ is the wave amplitude, $k$ is the wavenumber, and $\omega$ is the angular frequency. In finite water depth $h$, these quantities satisfy the dispersion relation

$$\omega^2 = gk\tanh(kh)$$

The vessel response is commonly represented by six generalized coordinates corresponding to surge, sway, heave, roll, pitch and yaw. In the frequency domain, the linear equations of motion can be written in matrix form as

$$\sum_{\ell=1}^{6}\left[-\omega^2\left(M_{j\ell}+A_{j\ell}(\omega)\right)+i\omega B_{j\ell}(\omega)+C_{j\ell}\right]\hat{\zeta}_{\ell}=\hat{F}_{Ej},\qquad j=1,\ldots,6$$

Here $M$ is the generalized mass matrix, $A$ is the added-mass matrix, $B$ is the radiation-damping matrix, $C$ is the hydrostatic restoring matrix, and $\hat{F}_{E}$ is the complex wave excitation force or moment. The corresponding RAO is the complex ratio between a vessel motion amplitude and the incident wave amplitude, and is used to estimate motions, accelerations and loads in specified sea states.

== Factors ==
A number of factors affect seakeeping or how correctly the ship responds.

- Size: A larger ship will generally have lower motions than a smaller one. This is because the relative size of the waves is lower.
- Displacement: A heavier ship will generally have lower motions than a lighter one. Given that the wave energy is the same for each vessel and provides the exciting force, the one with the greater mass will have the lower accelerations.
- Stability: A stable ship will tend to follow the wave profile more closely than a less stable one. This means that a more stable ship will generally have higher accelerations but lower amplitudes of motion.
- Freeboard: The greater a vessel's freeboard the less likely it is to immerse the deck. Deck immersion is often a seakeeping criterion, as it affects mission capability in a number of ships.
- Human factor: Often the most critical factors in seakeeping, especially in small vessels, are the experience and skills of the crew in extreme situations. Allied to these are avoiding seasickness, getting sufficient sleep, food and drink and staying injury-free for the duration of an extreme event.
- Sea state, wave spectrum and relative direction. There may be undesirable resonances at some frequencies. Pitch and roll may be excited to dangerous amplitudes if the natural frequency of the hull coincides with incidence of waves and there is insufficient damping. Ship heading and speed have a large influence on the frequency of incidence of waves.
- Damping of pitch and roll counteract resonant motions. Sometimes a change to the moment of inertia by shifting ballast can detune resonance.
- Directional stability, or yaw stability, which affects course-keeping, particularly in bow and quartering seas, and in overtaking seas, when flow velocity past the rudder may drop significantly, or become negative, while bow immersion may simultaneously increase, moving the centre of lateral area forward.

Response to given sea conditions by a given hull may vary considerably depending on loading, free-surface of tanks, weight distribution, speed, and direction of travel.

== See also ==
- Hull (watercraft) – Watertight buoyant body of a ship or boat
- Seaworthiness (law) – Assurance that a vessel can make a voyage
- Ship motions – Ships motions as defined by the six degrees of freedom of motion
- Turtling (sailing) – Turning a boat upside down

== Related subjects ==
- Airworthiness – Measure of an aircraft's suitability for safe flight
- Crashworthiness – Vehicle parameter
- Cyberworthiness – Cybersecurity concept
- Railworthiness – Railway vehicle's suitability for safe operation
- Roadworthiness – Vehicle meeting acceptable standards for safe driving
- Spaceworthiness – Measure of the quality of spacecraft

== Bibliography ==
- Brown, David K. (1988). "Seaworthy by Design". Warship International. XXV (4): 341–352. ISSN 0043-0374.
