= Railworthiness =

Railway vehicle's suitability for safe operation

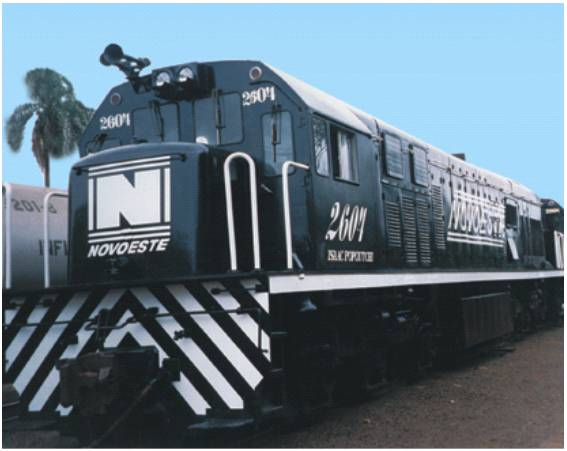
Train Novoeste

Railworthiness is the property or ability of a locomotive, passenger car, freight car, train or any kind of railway vehicle to be in proper operating condition or to meet acceptable safety standards of project, manufacturing, maintenance and railway use for transportation of persons, luggage or cargo.

Railworthiness is the condition of the rail system and its suitability for rail operations in that it has been designed, constructed, maintained and operated to approved standards and limitations by competent and authorised individuals, who are acting as members of an approved organisation and whose work is both certified as correct and accepted on behalf of the rail system owner.

== See also ==
- Airworthiness
- Anticlimber
- Buff strength
- Crashworthiness
- Cyberworthiness
- Roadworthiness
- Seaworthiness
- Spaceworthiness
