= Spaceworthiness =

Measure of the quality of spacecraft

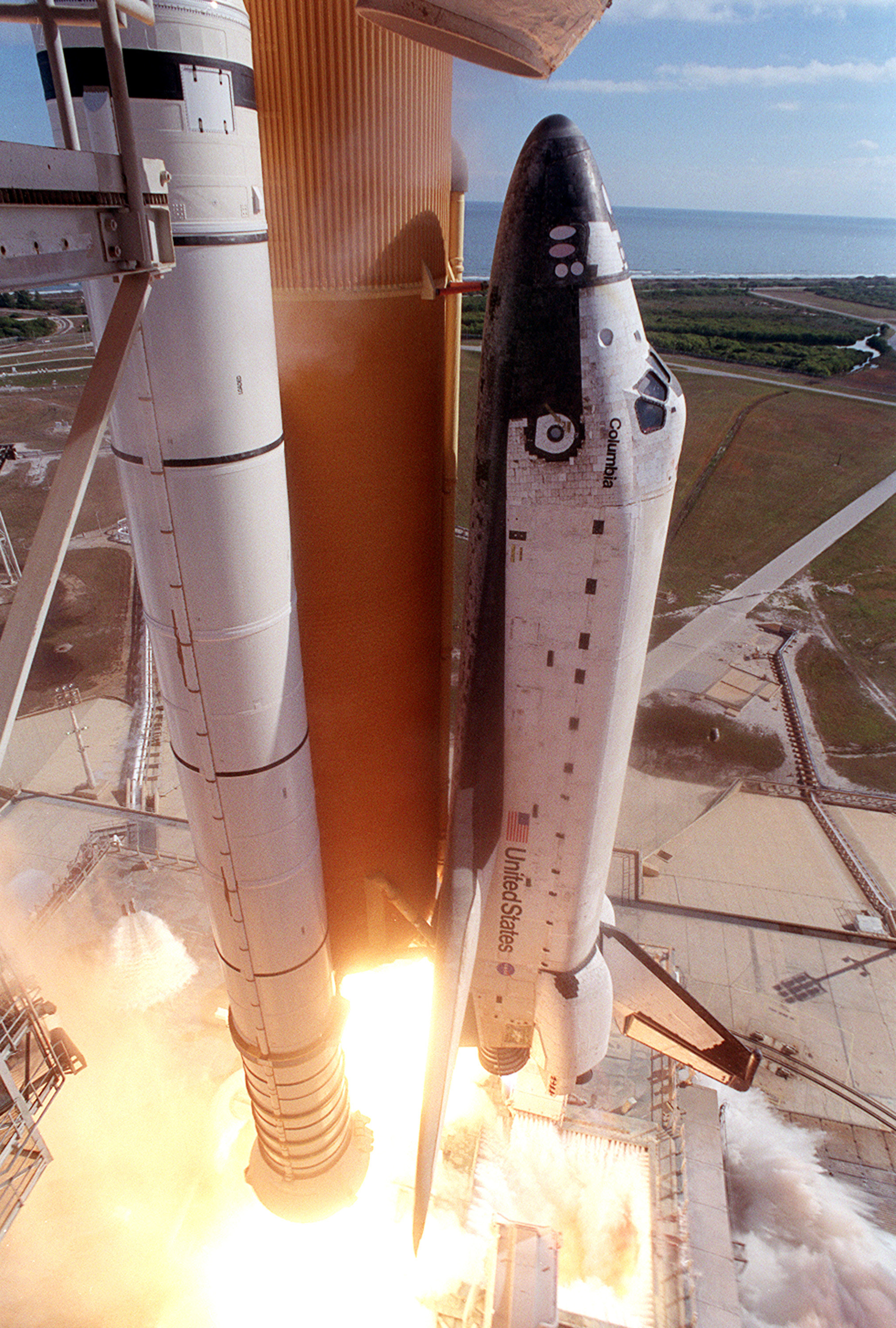
Space Shuttle Columbia, thought to be spaceworthy despite damage incurred during this liftoff, was destroyed by it upon re-entry.

Spaceworthiness, or aerospaceworthiness, is a property, or ability of a spacecraft to perform to its design objectives and navigate successfully through both the space environment and the atmosphere as part of a journey to or from space. The concept may less commonly be extended to other devices, such as spacesuits, which are designed to spend some amount of time exposed to space.

As in airworthiness, the spaceworthiness of a spacecraft depends on at least three basic components:

- design of the spacecraft, which covers activities of engineering evaluation, simulations, laboratory and prototype tests, and experimental flights;
- production, which seeks to ensure that the spacecraft has been assembled in conformity with the design specification;
- maintenance of the spacecraft, after production, before and during each flight mission.

Spaceworthiness is typically maintained through a maintenance program and / or a system of analysis, diagnosis and management of health and reliability of the spacecraft.

== Related concepts ==
Spaceworthiness of launch vehicles and spacecraft is an extension of the concepts of roadworthiness for cars, railworthiness for trains, seaworthiness for boats and ships, and airworthiness for aircraft.

== See also ==
- Crashworthiness
- Cyberworthiness
- Railworthiness
