= Airworthiness =

Measure of an aircraft's suitability for safe flight

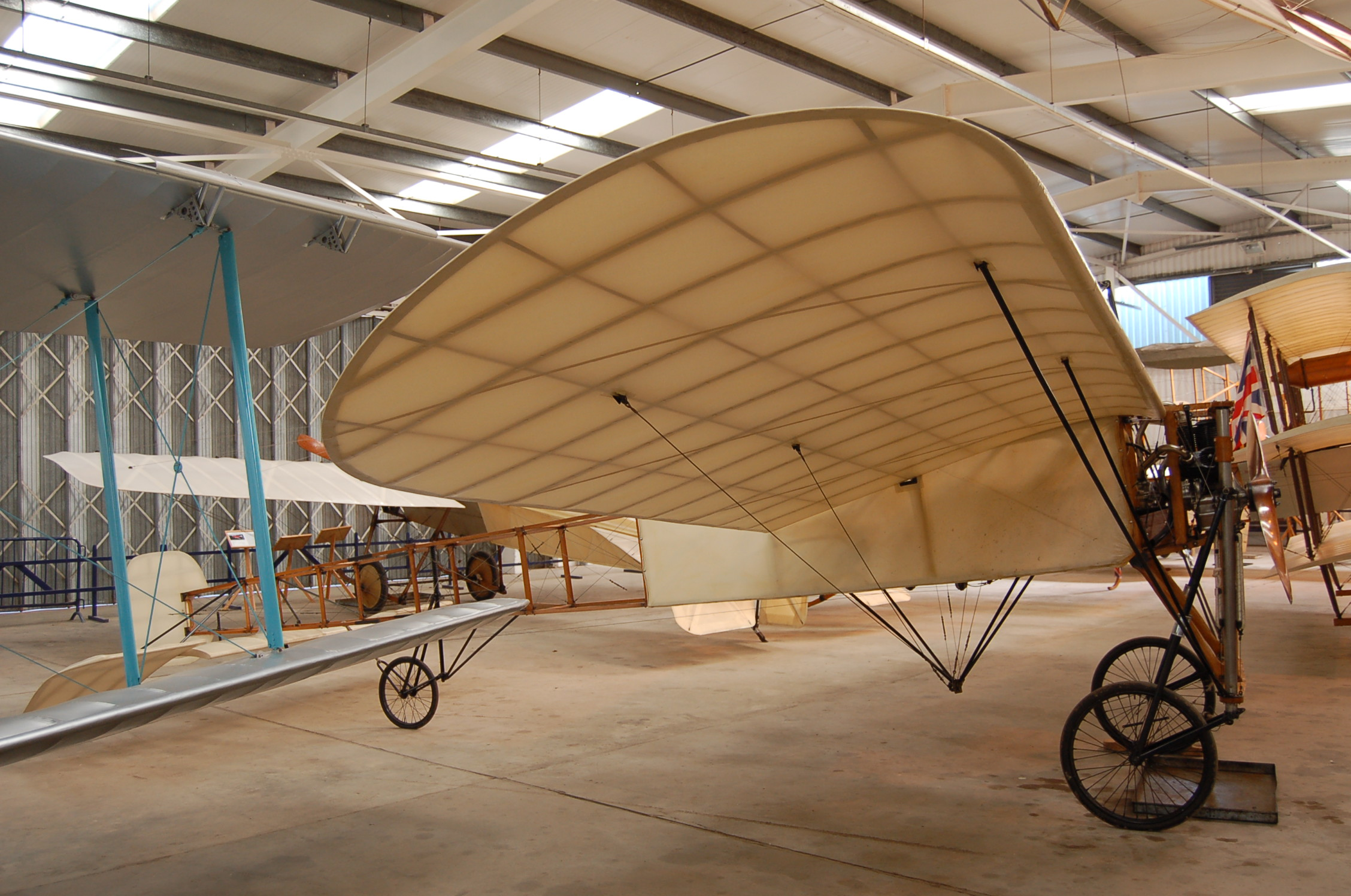
Blériot XI, civil registration G-AANG. Built in 1909 and operated by the Shuttleworth Collection in the United Kingdom, this is the world's oldest airworthy aircraft

In aviation, airworthiness is the measure of an aircraft's suitability for safe flight. Initial airworthiness is demonstrated by a certificate of airworthiness issued by the civil aviation authority in the state in which the aircraft is registered, and continuing airworthiness is achieved by performing the required maintenance actions.

Certification is based on standards applied by civil aviation authorities. Interoperability is served when national benchmarks adopt standards from international civil and military organizations such as International Civil Aviation Organization (ICAO), European Aviation Safety Agency (EASA), NATO and European Defence Agency (EDA).

In the U.S., Title 14, Code of Federal Regulations, Subchapter F, Part 91.7 states: "a) No person may operate an aircraft unless it is in an airworthy condition. b) The pilot in command of a civil aircraft is responsible for determining whether that aircraft is in condition for safe flight. The pilot in command shall discontinue the flight when unairworthy mechanical, electrical, or structural conditions occur which compromise the airworthiness."

== Jurisdictional heterogeneity ==
One airworthiness regulation is found in ICAO international standard of Annex 8 to Chicago Convention on International Civil Aviation which defines "airworthy" - in respect of an aircraft, engine, propeller or part there of - as "The status of an aircraft, engine, propeller or part when it conforms to its approved design and is in a condition for safe operation". The application of airworthiness defines the condition of an aircraft and its suitability for flight, in that it has been designed with engineering rigor, constructed, maintained and is expected to be operated to approved standards and limitations, by competent and approved individuals, who are acting as members of an approved organization and whose work is both certified as correct and accepted on behalf of the state of aircraft registry.

Apart from this organization, there are other ones like Federal Aviation Administration (FAA) or EASA that establish their own rules. In the case of the FAA, the regulation of airworthiness is found in Title 14 in the collected Code of Federal Regulations. The EASA specifications are found in several regulations: as nº 216/2008 (Basic Regulations), nº 748/2012 (Initial Airworthiness), nº 2015/640 (Additional specifications about airworthiness) and nº 1321/2014 (Continuing airworthiness).

== European regulation ==
In the regulation (UE) nº216/2008, common rules in the aviation sector are established and created the European Aviation Safety Agency. Article 5 of this regulation details the first specifications about airworthiness. Article 20 is about airworthy certification.

The main objective of these rules are to establish and to maintain a high and uniform security level at the civil aviation in Europe. For that reason, it lays down different rules according to the airworthiness:

- The jets will accomplish the essential established requirements in annex I in airworthy section.
- It will be proved that the products possess a type certificate. Moreover, it is necessary to include modifications certificate of the same jet. This should be included in supplementary type certificate. Both of them may be sold when an applicant proves that their product achieves the regulations' basis.
- No airplane can be operated without a valid certificate of airworthiness (C of A)
- A certificate of airworthiness will be issued when the applicant has demonstrated that the aircraft is conformed to the design of the model approved in its type certificate and that the pertinent documentation, inspections and tests confirm that the aircraft is in a condition for safe use. The certificate of airworthiness shall be valid as long as it is not canceled, or annulled, or is left without effect, provided that the aircraft is kept in accordance with the essential requirements for maintenance of airworthiness.
- The Commission will ensure, in particular, because the current state of the art and best practices in airworthiness are reflected; keep in mind the experience accumulated in service by aircraft throughout the world, as well as scientific and technical progress; allow immediate response, once the causes of accidents and serious incidents are determined; do not impose requirements on aircraft that are incompatible with the obligations assumed by the Member States by virtue of their belonging of the International Civil Aviation Organization (ICAO).

=== Initial airworthiness ===
The Regulation (EU) No. 748/2012 establishes the dispositions of application on the airworthiness and environmental certification of aircraft and related products, components and equipment, as well as the certification of design and production organizations.

Besides of the technical requirements and common administratives procedures by the airworthiness and environmental certification, the following aspects can be found too in regulation nº 748/2012:

- The dispatch of type certificates, of restricted type certificates, of supplementary type certificates, as well as the modifications of said certificates.
- The dispatch of repair design approvals.
- The demonstration that environmental protection requirements are met.
- The dispatch of noise level certificates.
- The identification and certification of products, components and equipment.
- The certification of the design and production organizations.
- The dispatch of airworthiness directives.

This regulation contains an annex, Part-21, which specifies the requirements and procedures for the certification of aircraft and related products, components and equipment, and design and production organizations. Apart from this annex, there are also several certification specifications, including CS-25, for large aircraft, and CS-23, for medium and small aircraft.

In application, airworthiness standards include a probability of loss of aircraft (PLOA) that is designed to be controllable (PLOAdc) as an overall attribute. Setting a sufficiently robust PLOA factor for the aircraft's ability to safely attain, sustain, and terminate flight protects the souls on board. An aircraft safe enough to carry human life is presumed safe to fly over people on the ground. For "airworthiness regulations [that] serve to protect people onboard the aircraft . . . the protection of persons and property on the ground [is] another benefit. "

However, for unmanned aircraft, airworthiness must only address the safety of people on the ground and not the aircraft itself. This changes the assessment of risks and hazards, allowing a new approach that accounts for risk and consequence in the setting of airworthiness requirements. For military unmanned aircraft, France developed an unmanned-unique airworthiness concept, later adapted by NATO, that isolates failures catastrophic to human life. The concept later came to be described as the "Cumulative Probability of all Catastrophic Failure Conditions" or (PCumCat). Here, two outcomes are addressed.

First, an airworthiness issue arises from an uncontrolled crash, which is defined as a condition resulting from one or a combination of failure conditions that prevents the flight control system from controlling and maneuvering the aircraft until the impact on the ground AEP-4671 page A-5. To be certified to fly over any population density, an hypothetical uncontrolled crash assumes that human life at the point of impact is lost.

In the second outcome, a forced landing or recovery at a predefined and unpopulated area is defined as a condition resulting from one or a combination of failure conditions that prevents the UAV from landing on its planned main landing site, although the flight control system is still able to control and maneuver the UAV. (see AEP-4671, page 1-F-19, U1413 & page A-2). While the aircraft may be lost, residual maneuverability directing to an unpopulated point of impact means this alternative is not catastrophic and therefore not an airworthiness factor. Though the aircraft may be lost or considered a hull loss, the flight has been safely terminated.

=== Additional airworthiness specifications ===
The Regulation (EU) nº 2015/640 establishes additional airworthiness specifications for operations and contains two annexes. The Annex I (Part 26), Subpart A, is devoted to general provisions on the appropriate authority, temporarily inoperative equipment and demonstration of conformity. Subpart B of the aforementioned annex focuses on large aircraft and contains specifications related to seats, berths, seat belts and harnesses; location, access and markings of emergency exits; emergency interior lighting and operation of emergency lights; interiors hold; flammability of the coatings of cargo compartments; fire protection for toilets; acoustic warning of the landing gear and systems for opening and closing the flight crew compartment door - incapacitation of a crew member. Annex II contains an amendment to Annex III (part ORO) of Regulation (EU) No. 965/2012.

=== Maintaining airworthiness ===
The Regulation (EU) No. 1321/2014 controls the continuing of the airworthiness of aircraft and aeronautical products, components and equipment and the approval of the organizations and staff who involve in these tasks. It contains 7 annexes, although Annex V has been repealed.

Annex I (Part M); Section A (Technical requirements), "establishes the measures that must be taken to ensure the continuing of airworthiness, including maintenance. Moreover, it specifies the conditions that must be achieved by the people or organizations involved in the management of airworthiness maintenance." Section B (Procedures for the competent authority) "establishes the administrative procedures to be followed by the competent authority for the application and enforcement of Section A of Part M."

The Annex II (Part 145); Section A (Technical requirements), "establishes the requirements which an organization must obey to be able to award or maintain a continuing approval of the elements and aircraft." The Section B (Procedures for Competent Administration) "establishes the administrative procedures that must be followed by the competent authority to execute its tasks and responsibilities in connection with the concession, modification, suspension or revocation of approvals of maintenance organizations Part 145."

The Annex III (Part 66); Section A (Technical requirements), "define the aircraft continuing license and set the requirements for its application, dispatch and continuity of its validity." The Section B (Procedures for the competent authority) "establishes the procedures, requirements, administrative requirements, measurement and control of compliance with Section A of Part 66."

The Annex IV (Part 147); Section A (Technical requirements), "establishes the requirements that must be fulfilled by the organizations that request authorization to carry out training courses and specific examinations in Part 66." Section B (Procedures for competent administration) "establishes the administrative requirements that must be followed by the competent authorities for the application of section A of this part."

The Annex V bis (Part T); Section A (Technical requirements), "establishes the requirements to ensure maintenance of the continuing airworthiness of the aircraft referred to in Article 1, letter b), in accordance with the fundamental requirements set out in Annex IV of the Regulations (EC) No. 216/2008. The conditions to be had by the people and organizations responsible for managing the maintenance of airworthiness and the maintenance of the aircraft in question are also specified." The Section B (Procedures for Competent Authorities) "establishes the administrative procedures that must be followed by the competent authorities in charge of the application and compliance of Section A of Part T."

The Annex VI contains a table of correspondence between Regulation (EC) No. 2042/2003 and these regulations.

== FAA regulations ==
The USA Federal Aviation Regulations, Part 21, §21.183(d) has a procedural definition of airworthy:
"other aircraft An applicant for a standard airworthiness certificate for aircraft not covered by paragraphs (a) through (c) (a:"New aircraft manufactured under a production certificate." b:"New aircraft manufactured under type certificate only." c:"Import aircraft.") of this section is entitled to a standard airworthiness certificate if -- (1) He presents evidence to the Administrator that the aircraft conforms to a type design approved under a type certificate or a supplemental type certificate and to applicable Airworthiness Directives; (2) The aircraft (except an experimentally certificated aircraft that previously had been issued a different airworthiness certificate under this section) has been inspected in accordance with the performance rules for 100-hour inspections set forth in part 43.15 of this chapter and found airworthy by-- (i)The manufacturer; (ii)The holder of a repair station certificate as provided in part 145 of this chapter; (iii)The holder of a mechanic certificate as authorized in part 65 of this chapter; (v)The holder of a certificate issued under part 121 of this chapter, and having a maintenance and inspection organization appropriate to the aircraft type; and (3)The Administrator finds after inspection, that the aircraft conforms to the type design, and is in condition for safe operation."

An example of an aircraft that was not legally airworthy is the one used in the Lawnchair Larry flight in 1982.

The definition of the term "Airworthy" was never included in the Code of Federal Regulations until the 14 CFR Part 3, General Requirements, was established. The definition was included in the guidance, such as Advisory Circulars and Orders, but never in the Rule. Part 3 defines an Airworthy aircraft as one that conforms to its type design and is in a condition for safe flight.

A more generic and non-process oriented definition of airworthiness is in JSP553 Military Airworthiness Regulations (2006) Edition 1 Change 5:

The ability of an aircraft or other airborne equipment or system to operate without significant hazard to aircrew, ground crew, passengers (where relevant) or to the general public over which such airborne systems are flown

This definition applies equally to civil and military aircraft. An example of a method used to delineate "significant hazard" is a risk reduction technique used by the military and used widely throughout engineering known as ALARP (As Low As Reasonably Practicable). This is defined as:

‘The principle, used in the application of the Health and Safety at Work Act, that safety should be improved beyond the baseline criteria so far as is reasonably practicable. A risk is ALARP when it has been demonstrated that the cost of any further Risk reduction, where cost includes the loss of capability as well as financial or other resource costs, is grossly disproportionate to the benefit obtained from that Risk reduction.’

In the U.S. Code of Federal Regulations, Title 14, Part 23, § 23.200, states, for the purposes of this part, the following definition applies: "Continued safe flight and landing means an airplane is capable of continued controlled flight and landing, possibly using emergency procedures, without requiring exceptional pilot skill or strength. Upon landing, some airplane damage may occur as a result of a failure condition."

== Canadian regulations ==
In Canada Canadian Aviation Regulations, CAR 101.01, Subpart 1 - Interpretation Content last revised: 2007/12/30
"airworthy" - in respect of an aeronautical product, means in a fit and safe state for flight and in conformity with its type design.

== See also ==
- Air safety
- EASA
- FAA
- Type certificate

== Related subjects ==
- Seaworthiness
- Roadworthiness
- Railworthiness
- Spaceworthiness
- Crashworthiness
- Cyberworthiness
