= Fascia (car) =

Decorative panels of a car's dashboard

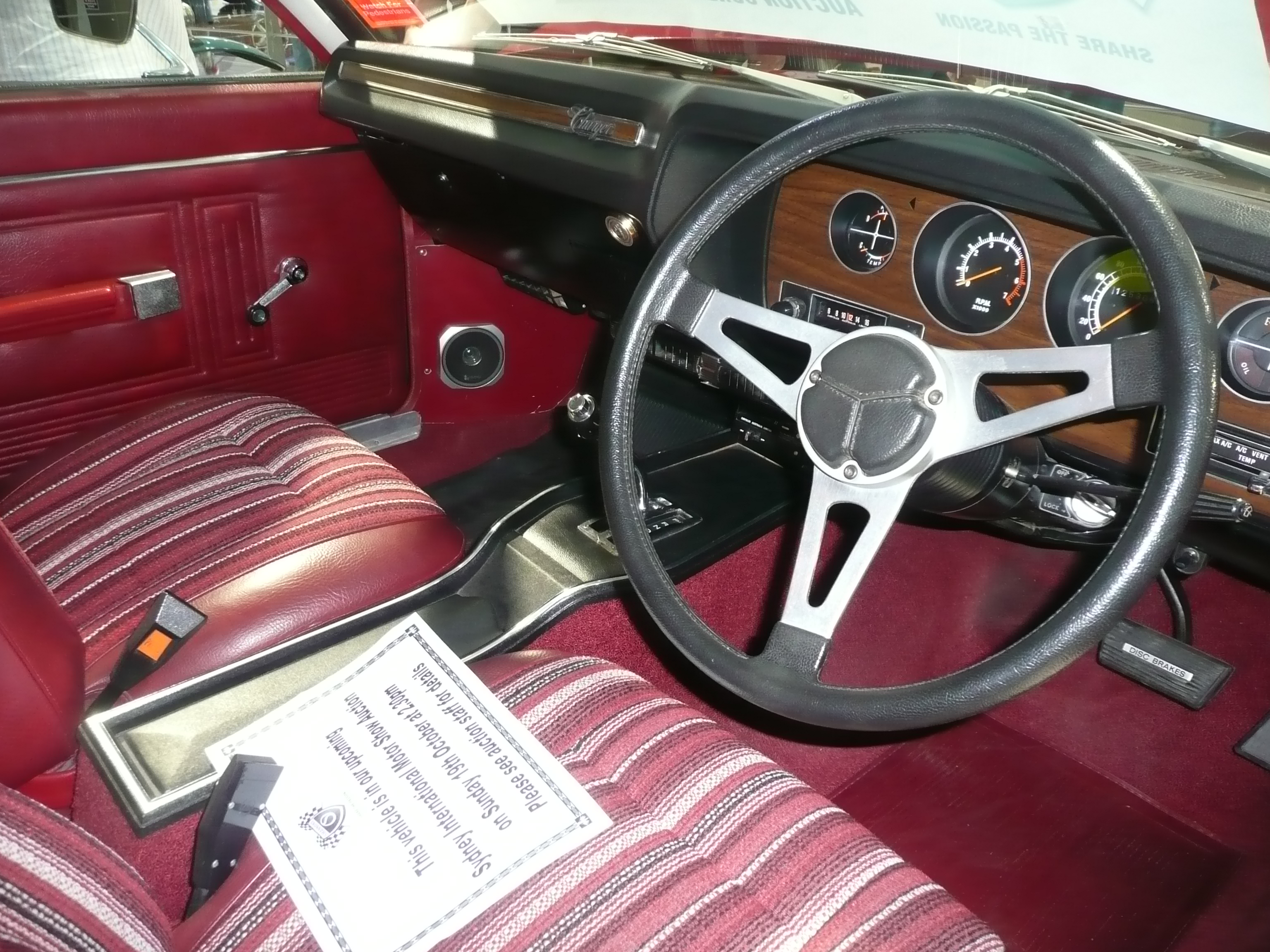
This 1976 Chrysler includes a typical fake-wood fascia.

Fascia (/ˈfeɪʃə/) is a term used in the automotive world that refers to the decorative panels of a car's dashboard or the dashboard assembly.

Regulations affecting bumper design in the late 1970s saw the increasing use of soft plastic materials on the front and rear of vehicles. Fascia was adopted then as the term to describe these soft areas, but is now increasingly used as a general term for a car's set of front-end components: grille, headlamps, front bumper, and other details.

A bumper valance panel, a piece that is mounted on top of the bumper, or is right under it, is also considered a part of the vehicle's fascia. Carmakers often design the body panels that form the nose of their vehicles to have a unified look across their model line (see the 'shark' grille by Mitsubishi, or 'tiger-nose' grille by Kia).

The word comes from the Italian word fascia (pronounced [ˈfaʃʃa]), meaning stripe.

== See also ==
- List of auto parts
