= Roadworthiness =

Vehicle meeting acceptable standards for safe driving

Roadworthiness or streetworthiness is a property or ability of a car, bus, truck or any kind of automobile to be in a suitable operating condition or meeting acceptable standards for safe driving and transport of people, baggage or cargo in roads or streets, being therefore street-legal.

In Europe, roadworthy inspection is regulated by:

- Directive 2014/45/EU, on periodic roadworthiness tests for motor vehicles and their trailers,
- Directive 2014/46/EU, on the registration documents for vehicles,
- Directive 2014/47/EU, on the technical roadside inspection of the roadworthiness of commercial vehicles.

== Certificate ==
A Certificate of Roadworthiness (also known as a ‘roadworthy’ or ‘RWC’) attests that a vehicle is safe enough to be used on public roads. A roadworthy is required in the selling of a vehicle in some countries. It may also be required when the vehicle is re-registered, and to clear some problematic notices.

"roadworthiness certificate" means a road-worthiness test report issued by the competent authority or a testing centre containing the result of the road-worthiness test

— DIRECTIVE 2014/45/EU OF THE EUROPEAN PARLIAMENT AND OF THE COUNCIL of 3 April 2014 on periodic roadworthiness tests for motor vehicles and their trailers and repealing Directive 2009/40/EC

== Inspection ==
Roadworthy inspection is designed to check the vehicle to make sure that its important auto parts are in a good (not top) condition that is enough for safe road use. It includes:

- mirrors
- wheels and tires
- vehicle structure
- lights and reflectors
- seats and seat belts
- steering, suspensions and braking systems
- windscreen, and windows including front wipers and washers
- other safety related items on the body, chassis or engine

Roadworthy inspection in Europe

Directive 2014/45/EU regulates the periodic testing for various kind of vehicles:

- transport of people (M1, M2, M3)
- transport of good (N1, N2, N3)
- trailers of more than 3.5 tonnes (O3, O3)
- tractors of category T5
- since January 2022, two- or three-wheel vehicles in categories L3e, L4e, L5e and L7e, with an engine displacement of more than 125 cm3.

18 of 27 EU member states have required motorcycle owners to have their vehicles checked for road-worthiness. The directive 2014/45/EU defines obligations and responsibilities, minimum requirements concerning road-worthiness tests, administrative provisions and cooperation and exchange of information.

Minimum requirements concerning road-worthiness tests encompass date and frequency of testing, contents and methods of testing, assessment of deficiencies, road-worthiness certificate, follow-up of deficiencies and proof of test.

The test shall cover at least the following areas:

(0) Identification of the vehicle;

(1) Braking equipment;

(2) Steering;

(3) Visibility;

(4) Lighting equipment and parts of the electrical system;

(5) Axles, wheels, tires, suspension;

(6) Chassis and chassis attachments;

(7) Other equipment;

(8) Nuisance;

(9) Supplementary tests for passenger-carrying vehicles of categories M2 and M3

— 2014/45/EU

== See also ==
- Airworthiness
- Crashworthiness
- Cyberworthiness
- Railworthiness
- Seaworthiness
- Spaceworthiness
- Street-legal vehicle
- Vehicle inspection
