= Bumper (car) =

Structure at front and rear ends of a car

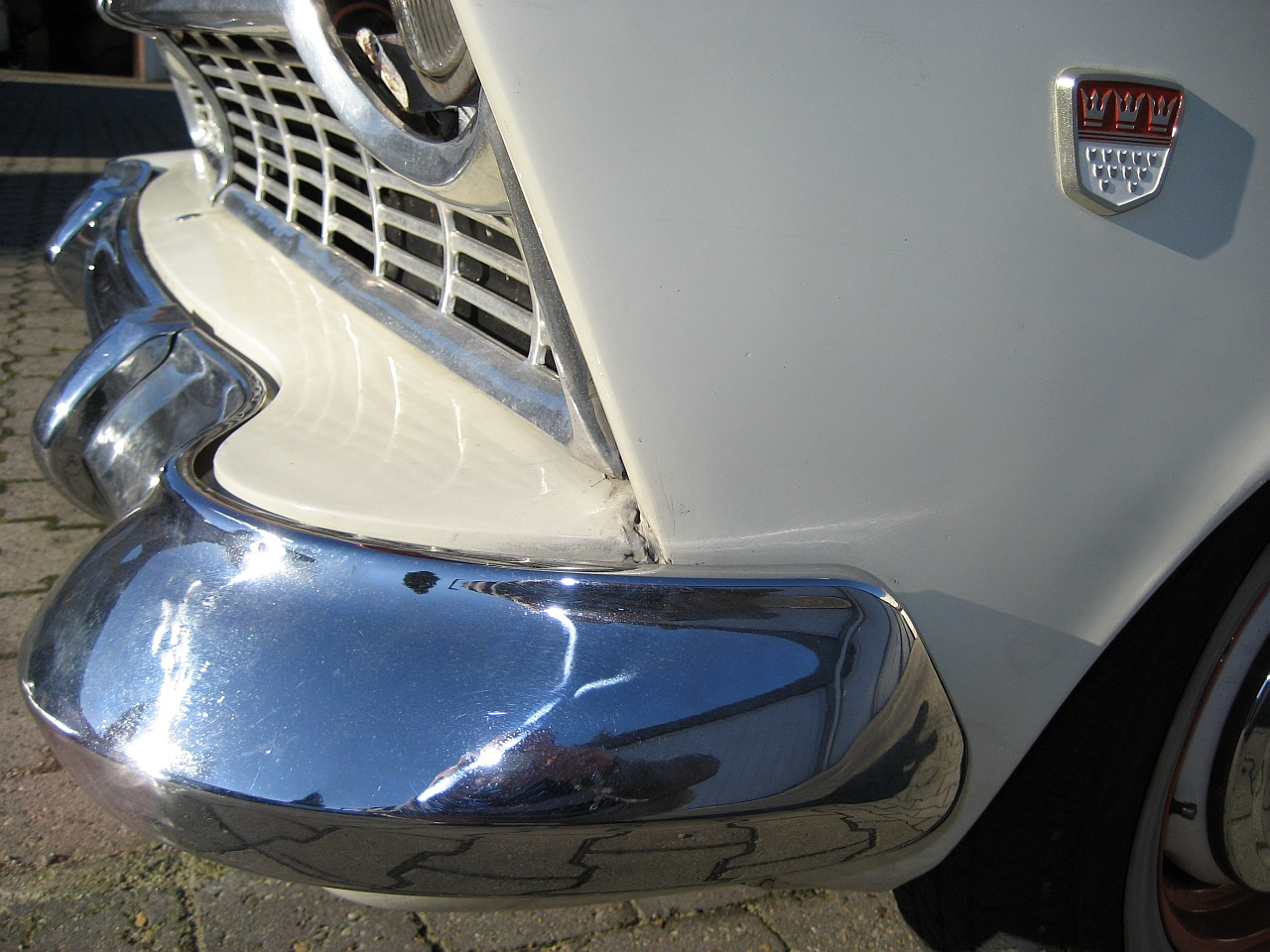
Chrome plated front bumper on a 1958 Ford Taunus

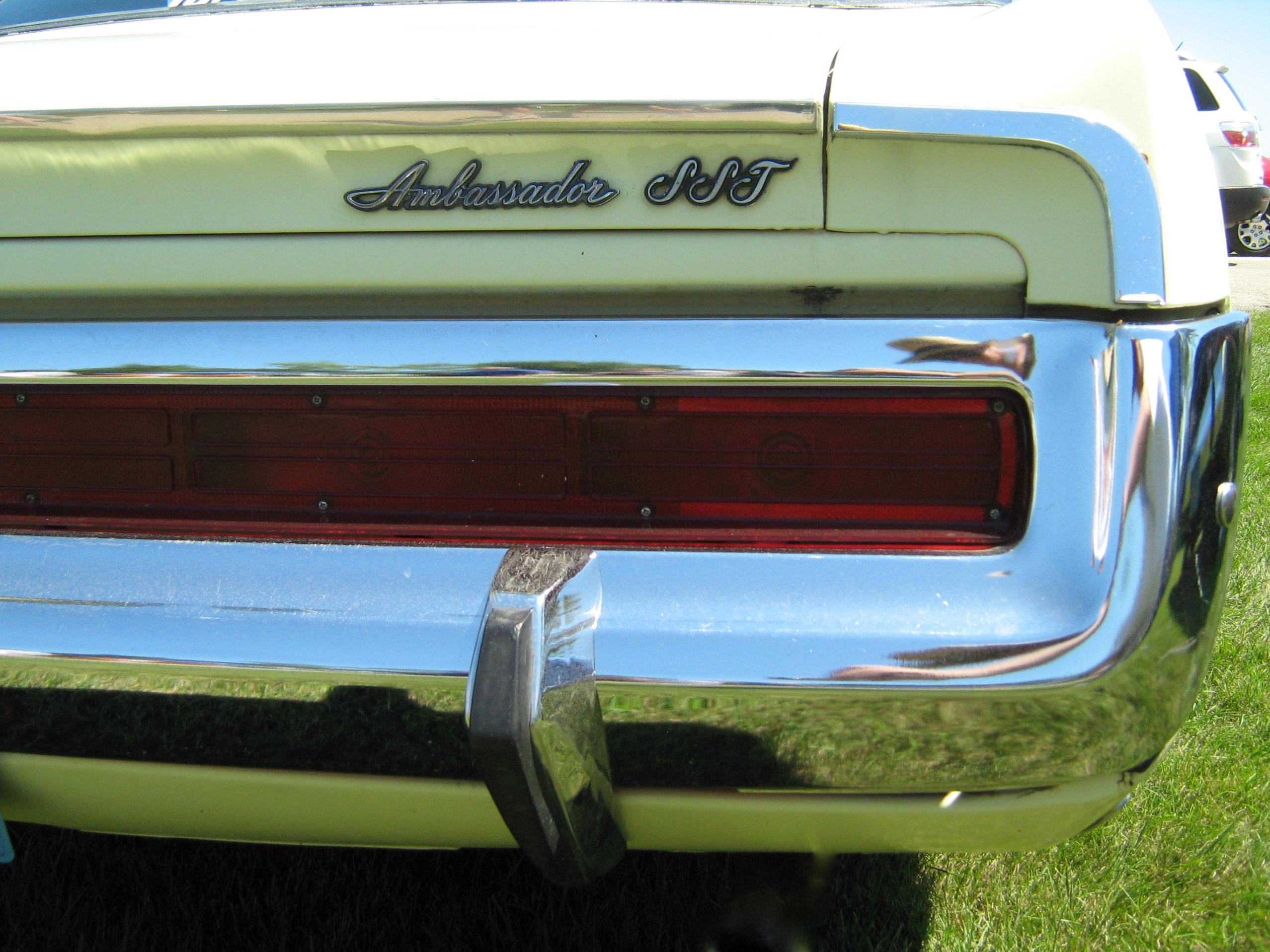
Rear bumper with integrated tail lamps and a rubber-faced guard on a 1970 AMC Ambassador

A bumper is a structure attached to or integrated with the front and rear ends of a motor vehicle, to absorb impact in a minor collision, ideally minimizing repair costs. Stiff metal bumpers appeared on automobiles as early as 1904 that had a mainly ornamental function. Numerous developments, improvements in materials and technologies, as well as greater focus on functionality for protecting vehicle components and improving safety have changed bumpers over the years. Bumpers ideally minimize height mismatches between vehicles and protect pedestrians from injury. Regulatory measures have been enacted to reduce vehicle repair costs and, more recently, the impact on pedestrians.

== History ==
Bumpers were, at first, just rigid metal bars. George Albert Lyon invented the earliest car bumper. The first bumper appeared on a vehicle in 1897, and Nesselsdorfer Wagenbau-Fabriksgesellschaft, an Austrian carmaker, installed it. The construction of these bumpers was unreliable as they featured only a cosmetic function. Early car owners had the front spring hanger bolt replaced with ones long enough to attach a metal bar. G.D. Fisher patented a bumper bracket to simplify the attachment of the accessory. The first bumper designed to absorb impacts appeared in 1901. It was made of rubber, and Frederick Simms gained a patent in 1905.

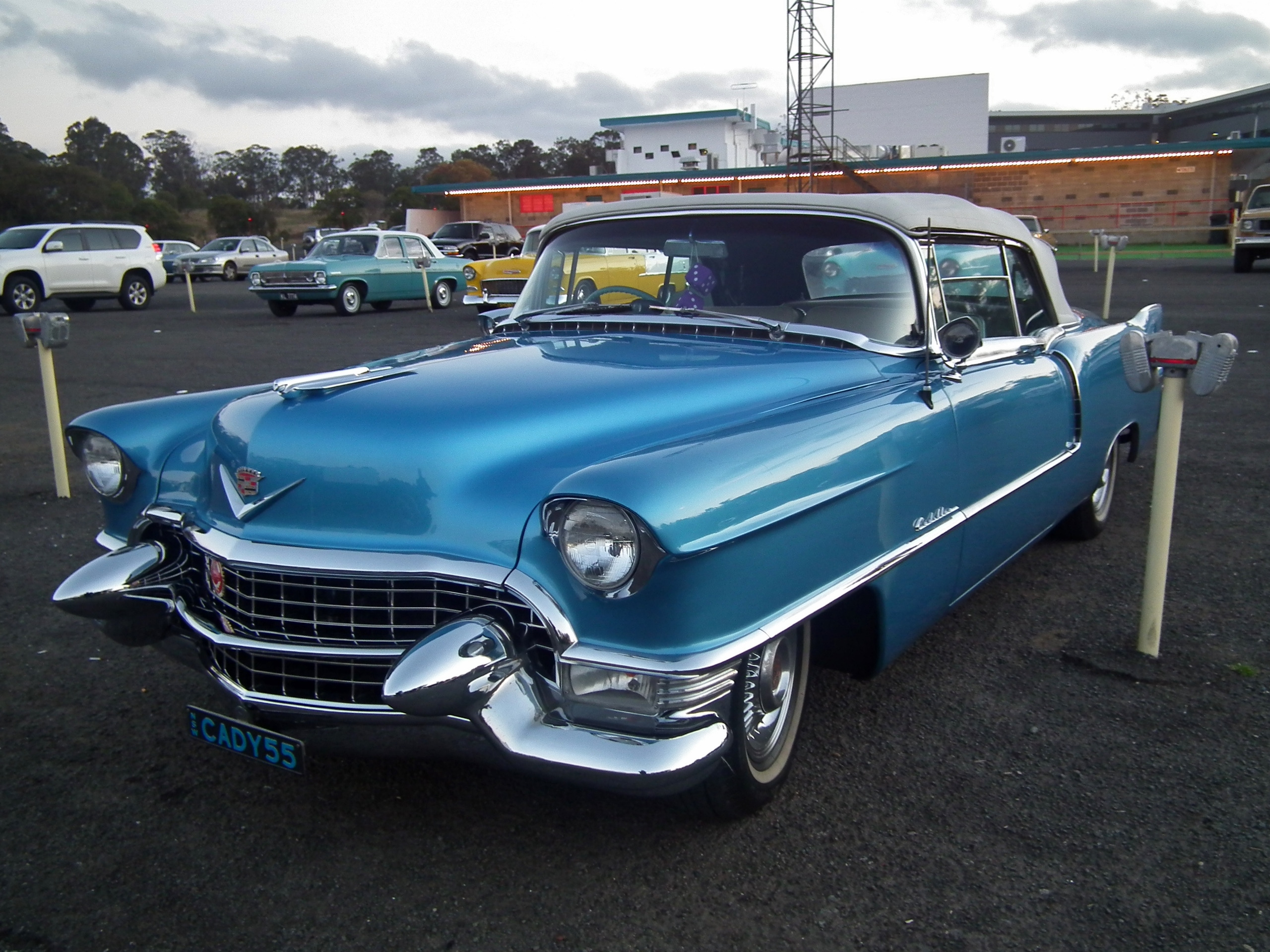
1955 Cadillac Eldorado with chromed "Dagmar" or "bullet" bumper

Automakers added bumpers in the mid-1910s, but consisted of a strip of steel across the front and back. Often treated as an optional accessory, bumpers became more and more common in the 1920s as automobile designers made them more complex and substantial. Over the next decades, chrome-plated bumpers became heavy, elaborative, and increasingly decorative until the late 1950s when U.S. automakers began establishing new bumper trends and brand-specific designs. The 1960s saw the use of lighter chrome-plated blade-like bumpers with a painted metal valance filling the space below it. Multi-piece construction became the norm as automakers incorporated grilles, lighting, and even rear exhaust into the bumpers.

On the 1968 Pontiac GTO, General Motors incorporated an "Endura" body-colored plastic front bumper designed to absorb low-speed impact without permanent deformation. It was featured in a TV advertisement with John DeLorean hitting the bumper with a sledgehammer, and no damage resulted. Similar elastomeric bumpers were available on the front and rear of the 1970-71 Plymouth Barracuda. In 1971, Renault introduced a plastic bumper (sheet moulding compound) on the Renault 5.

Current design practice is for the bumper structure on modern automobiles to consist of a plastic cover over a reinforcement bar made of steel, aluminum, fiberglass composite, or plastic. Bumpers of most modern automobiles have been made of a combination of polycarbonate (PC) and acrylonitrile butadiene styrene (ABS) called PC/ABS.

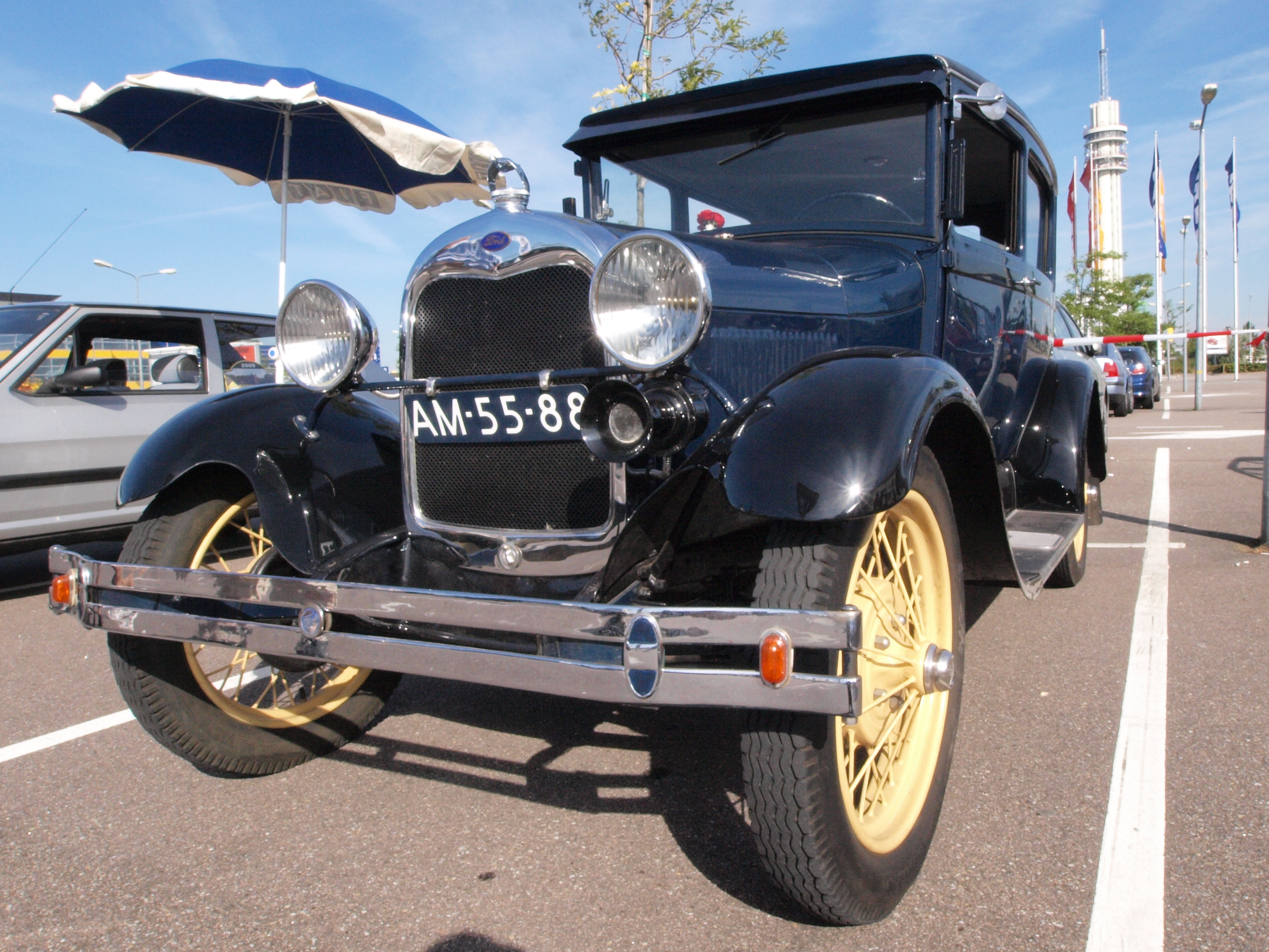
Ford Model A (1927–31) with metal bumpers

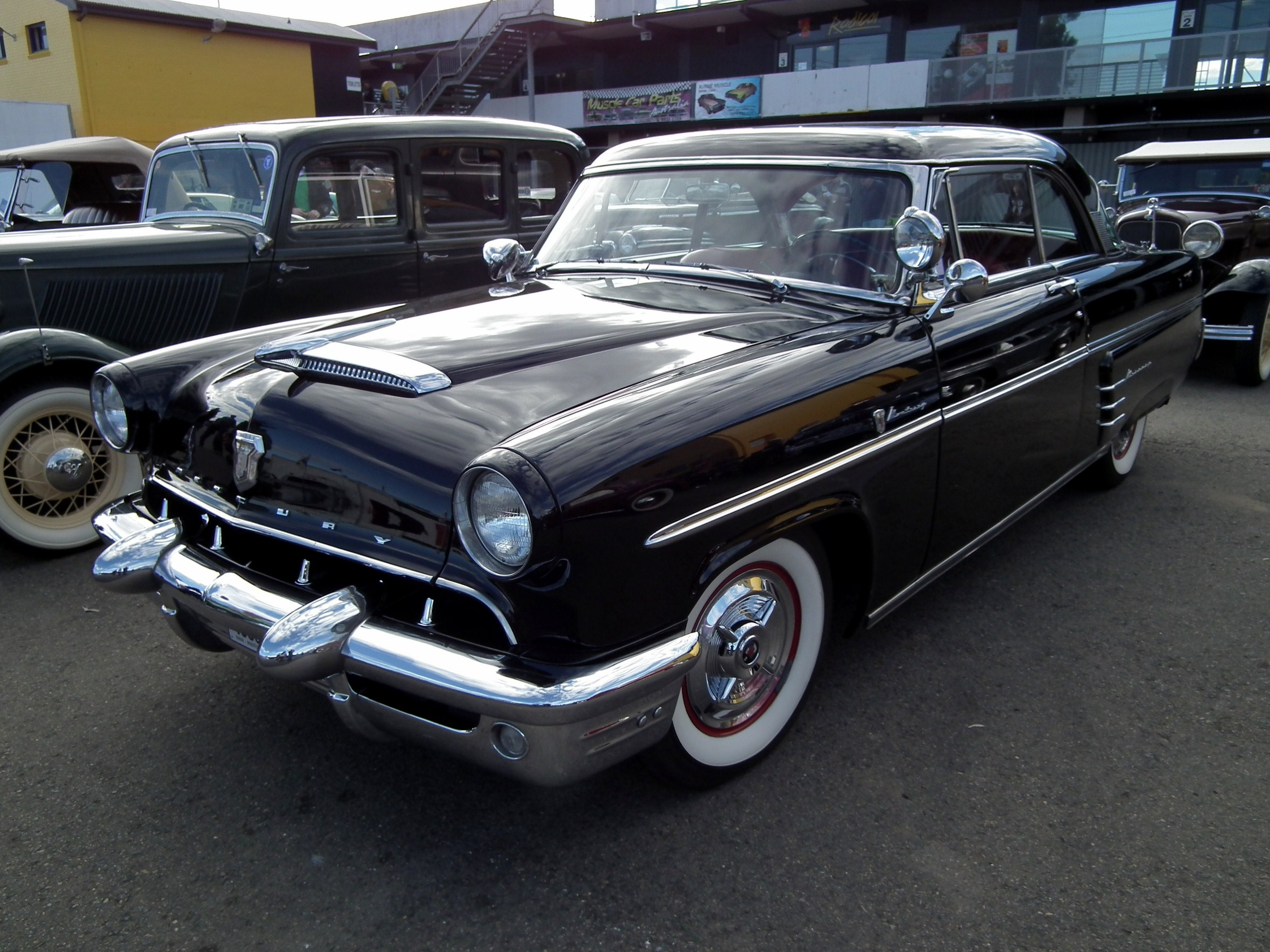
1953 Mercury Monterey with large chromed bumper

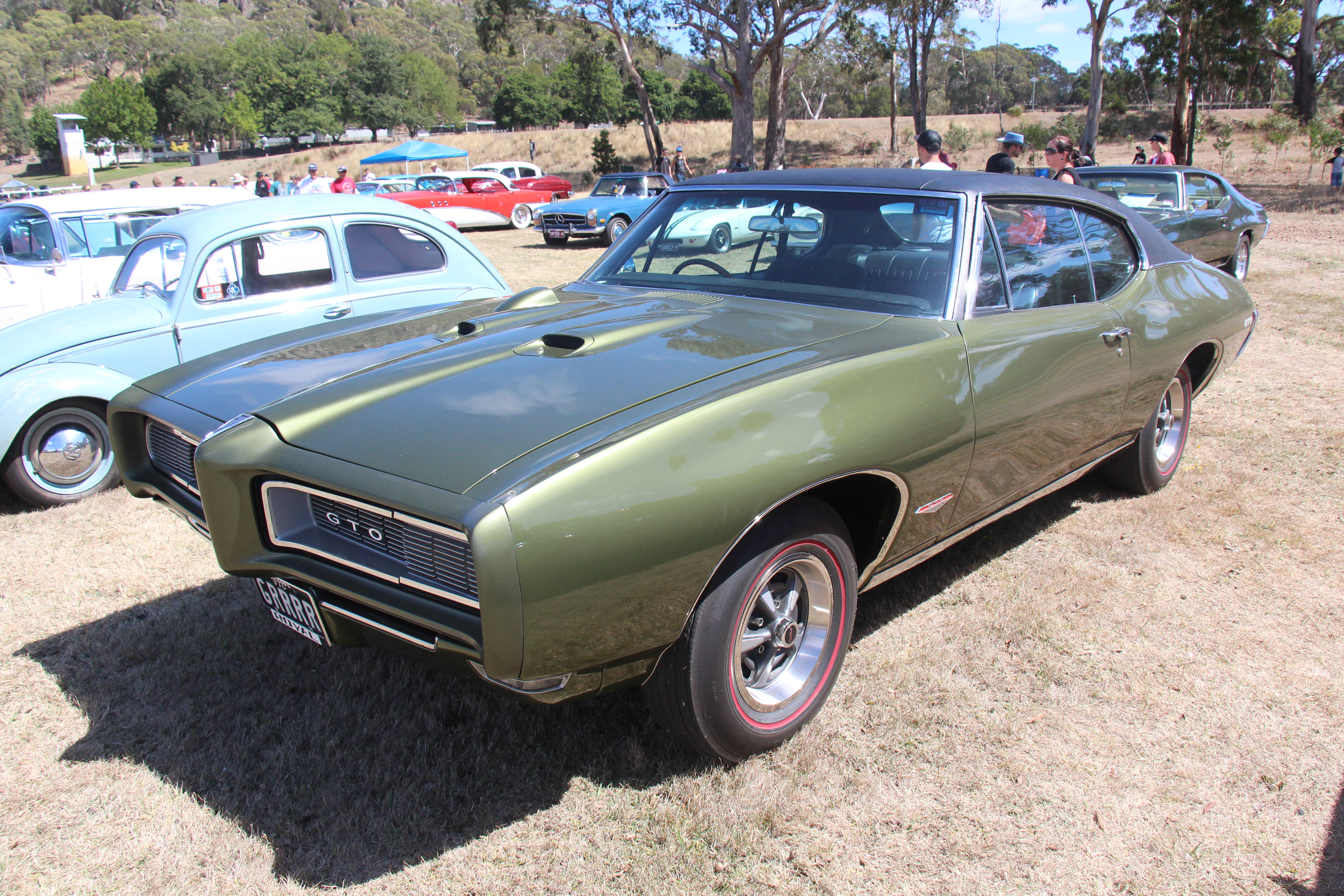
1968 Pontiac GTO with an elastomeric front bumper

== Physics ==
Bumpers offer protection to other vehicle components by dissipating the kinetic energy generated by an impact. This energy is a function of vehicle mass and velocity squared. The kinetic energy is equal to 1/2 the product of the mass and the square of the speed. In formula form:

$$E_\text{k} =\tfrac{1}{2} mv^2$$

Therefore, the force and energy loads multiply quadratically, not linearly, as speed increases. A bumper designed to protect vehicle components from damage at 5 miles per hour (8 km/h) must be four times as tough as one that protects at 2.5 mph (4 km/h), with the collision energy dissipation concentrated at the vehicle's extreme front and rear. Small increases in bumper protection can lead to weight gain and loss of fuel efficiency.

Until 1959, rigidity was seen as beneficial to occupant safety among automotive engineers. Modern theories of vehicle crashworthiness point in the opposite direction, towards vehicles that crumple progressively. A completely rigid vehicle might have excellent bumper protection for vehicle components, but would offer poor occupant safety.

== Pedestrian safety ==
Bumpers are increasingly being designed to mitigate injury to pedestrians struck by cars, such as through the use of bumper covers made of flexible materials. Front bumpers, especially, have been lowered and made of softer materials, such as foams and crushable plastics, to reduce the severity of impact on legs.

== Height mismatches ==
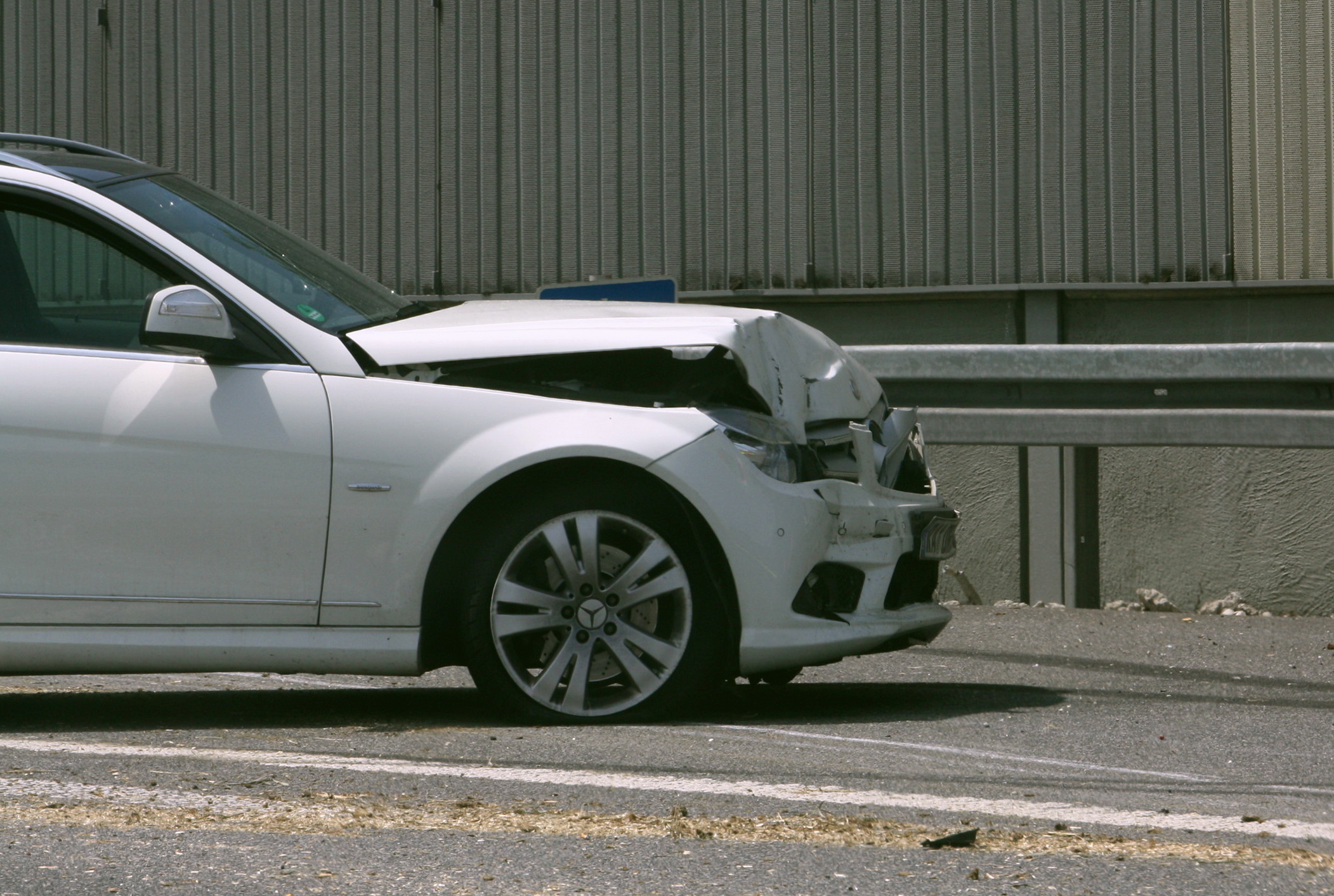
Damage from a low-speed but high-level impact; the energy-absorbing front bumper system is completely bypassed and untouched.

For passenger cars, the height and placement of bumpers are legally specified under both U.S. and EU regulations. Bumpers do not protect against moderate-speed collisions because, during emergency braking, the suspension changes the pitch of each vehicle, allowing bumpers to bypass each other when the vehicles collide. Preventing override and underride can be accomplished by extremely tall bumper surfaces. Active suspension is another solution for keeping the vehicle level.

Bumper height from the roadway surface is essential in engaging other protective systems. Airbag deployment sensors typically do not trigger until contact with an obstruction, and it is crucial that front bumpers be the first parts of a vehicle to make contact in the event of a frontal collision, to leave sufficient time to inflate the protective cushions.

Energy-absorbing crush zones are completely ineffective if physically bypassed. An example occurs when the elevated platform of a tractor-trailer misses the front bumper of a passenger car, and the contact with the rear of the rig is with the windshield of the car's passenger compartment.

Aftermarket modifications, such as "lift kits" that raise a vehicle's body higher above the axles, are legal in most of the United States. However, many jurisdictions restrict the height of the front or rear bumper to protect pedestrians. For example, New Hampshire requires that any vehicle, other than a private passenger car, have a height of any horizontal bumper that falls below the minimum distance of 16 in (41 cm) or above the maximum of 30 in (76 cm). Similarly, a modification that raises the front of a vehicle while keeping the rear low has resulted in driver and pedestrian fatalities. States such as Georgia, North Carolina, South Carolina, and Tennessee have banned the practice. Making a vehicle's front bumper four or more inches higher than the rear bumper is illegal in Virginia.

=== Truck vs. car ===
Underride collisions, in which a smaller vehicle, such as a passenger sedan, slides under a larger vehicle, such as a tractor-trailer, often result in severe injuries or fatalities. The platform bed of a typical tractor-trailer is at the head height of seated adults in a typical passenger car and thus can cause severe head trauma in even a moderate-speed collision. Around 500 people are killed this way in the United States annually.

Following the June 1967 death of actress Jayne Mansfield in an auto/truck accident, the U.S. National Highway Traffic Safety Administration recommended requiring a rear underride guard, also known as a "Mansfield bar", an "ICC bar", or a "DOT (Department of Transportation) bumper". These may not be more than 22 in (56 cm) from the road. The U.S. trucking industry has been slow to upgrade this safety feature, and there are no requirements to repair ICC bars damaged in service. However, in 1996 NHTSA upgraded the requirements for the rear underride prevention structure on truck trailers, and Transport Canada went further with an even more stringent requirement for energy-absorbing rear underride guards. In July 2015, NHTSA issued a proposal to upgrade the U.S. performance requirements for underride guards.

Many European nations have also required side underride guards to mitigate lethal collisions where the car impacts the truck from the side. A variety of different types of side underride guards of this nature are in use in Japan, the United States, and Canada. However, they are not required in the United States.

UN Regulation 58 sets forth requirements for rear underrun protective devices (RUPDs) and their installation, among which is that trucks and trailers of various types must have such devices with height above the ground not more than 45 cm (17.7 in), 50 cm (19.7 in), or 55 cm (21.7 in).

=== SUV vs. car ===
Mismatches between SUV bumper heights and passenger car side impact beams have allowed serious injuries at relatively low speeds. In the United States, NHTSA is studying how to address this issue as of 2014.

Beyond lethal interactions, the repair costs following passenger car/SUV collisions can also be high due to the height mismatch. This mismatch can result in vehicles being so severely damaged that they are inoperable after low-speed collisions.

== Regulation ==
In most jurisdictions, bumpers are legally required on all vehicles. Regulations for automobile bumpers have been implemented for two reasons: to allow the car to sustain low-speed impacts without damaging its safety systems, and to protect pedestrians from injury. These requirements conflict: bumpers that withstand impact well and minimize repair costs tend to injure pedestrians more, while pedestrian-friendly bumpers tend to have higher repair costs.

Although a vehicle's bumper systems are designed to absorb the energy of low-speed collisions and help protect the car's safety and other expensive nearby components, most bumpers are designed to meet only the minimum regulatory standards.

=== International standards ===
International safety regulations, devised initially as European standards under the auspices of the United Nations, have now been adopted by most countries outside North America. These specify that a car's safety systems must still function normally after a straight-on pendulum or moving-barrier impact of 4 km/h (2.5 mph) to the front and the rear, and to the front and rear corners of 2.5 km/h (1.6 mph) at 45.5 cm (18 in) above the ground with the vehicle loaded or unloaded.

==== Pedestrian safety ====
European countries have implemented regulations to address the issue of 270,000 deaths annually in worldwide pedestrian/auto accidents.

==== Bull bars ====
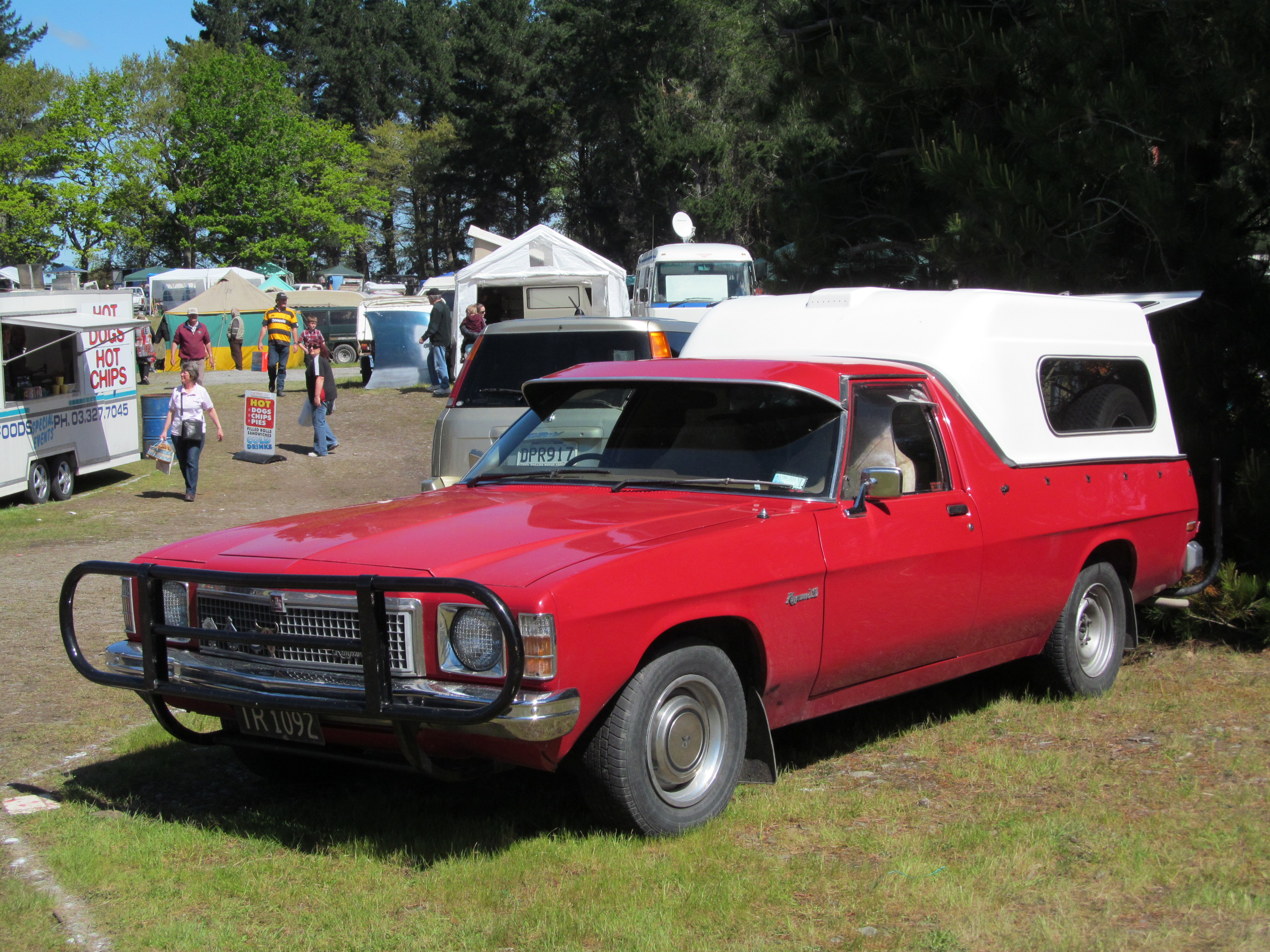
1978 Holden Kingswood Utility with "roo bar"

Specialized bumpers, known as "bull bars" or "roo bars", protect vehicles in rural environments from collisions with large animals. However, studies have shown that such bars increase the threat of death and serious injury to pedestrians in urban environments, because the bull bar is rigid and transmits all force of a collision to the pedestrian, unlike a bumper, which absorbs some force and crumples. In the European Union, the sale of rigid metal bull bars that do not comply with the relevant pedestrian-protection safety standards has been banned.

==== Off-road bumpers ====
Off-road vehicles often use aftermarket off-road bumpers made of heavy-gauge metal to improve ground clearance (height above the terrain), maximize departure angles, accommodate larger tires, and provide additional protection for the vehicle. Similar or identical to bull bars, off-road bumpers feature a rigid construction and do not absorb (by plastic deformation) any energy in a collision, which is more dangerous for pedestrians than factory plastic bumpers. The legality of the aftermarket off-road bumpers varies by jurisdiction. The United States federal bumper standard (49 CFR Part 581) sets impact and height requirements for passenger cars, meaning light trucks, SUVs, and multipurpose vehicles are exempt from those constraints. However, some cities or municipalities may have ordinances regarding off-road accessory guards or bumpers.

=== United States ===
Bumper regulations in the United States focus on preventing low-speed accidents from impairing safe vehicle operation, limiting damage to safety-related vehicle components, and containing the costs of repair after a crash.

==== First standards 1971 ====
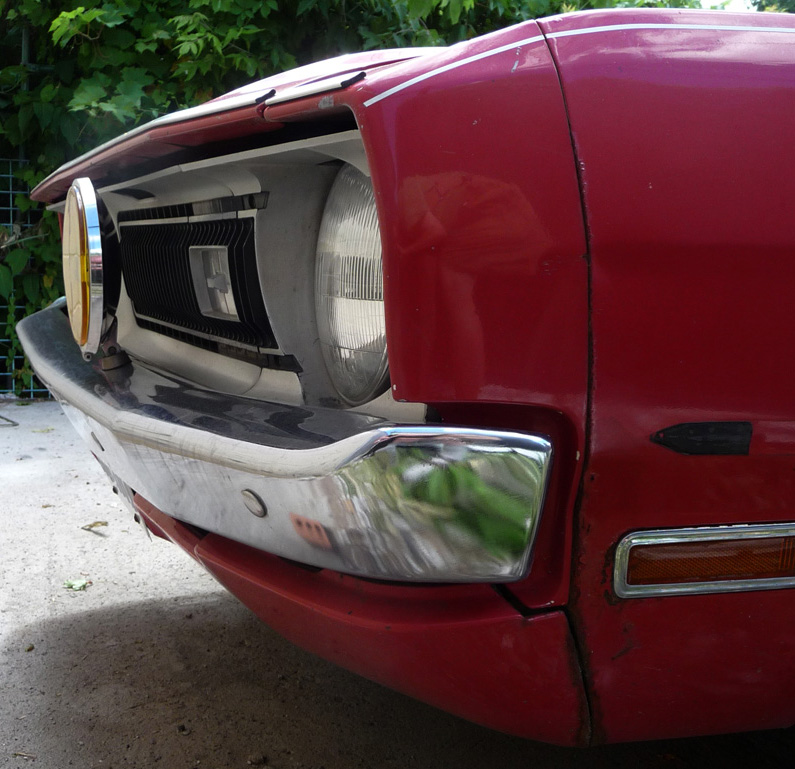

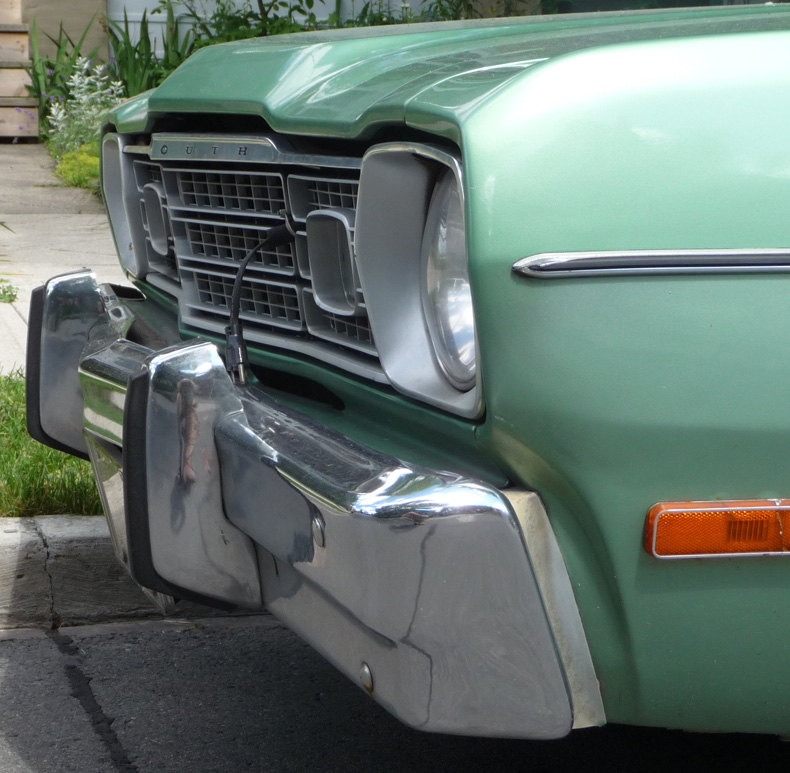

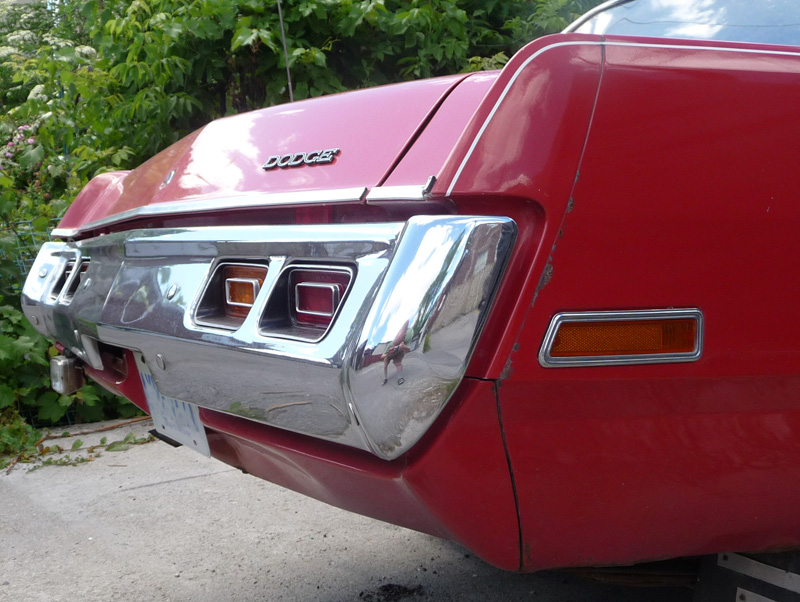

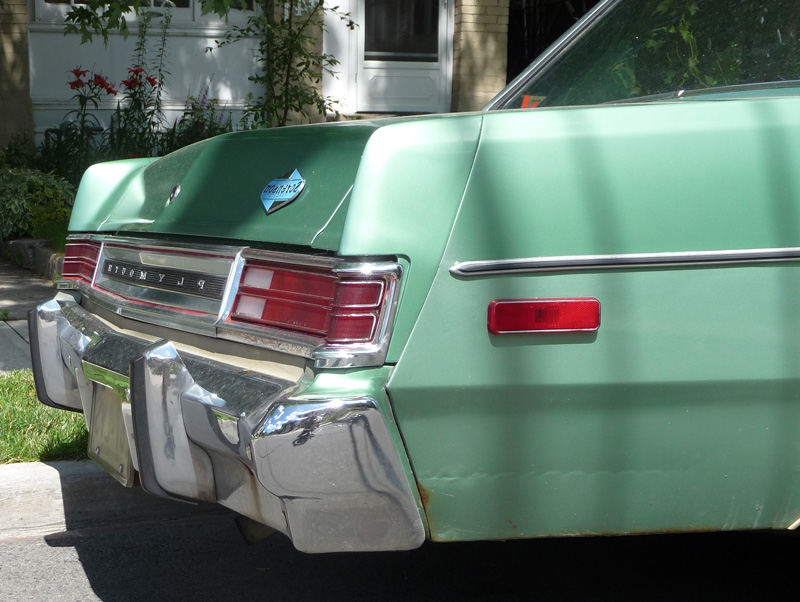

Front and rear bumpers on Chrysler A platform cars before (left, 1971) and after (right, 1974) the U.S. 5-mph bumper standard took effect. The 1974 bumpers protrude farther from the body, and the rear one no longer contains the taillamps.

In 1971, the U.S. National Highway Traffic Safety Administration (NHTSA) issued the country's first regulation applicable to passenger car bumpers. Federal Motor Vehicle Safety Standard No. 215 (FMVSS 215), "Exterior Protection," took effect on 1 September 1972—when most automakers would begin producing their model year 1973 vehicles. The standard prohibited functional damage to specified safety-related components such as headlamps and fuel system components when the vehicle is subjected to barrier crash tests at 5 miles per hour (8 km/h) for front and 2.5 mph (4 km/h) for rear bumper systems. The requirements effectively eliminated automobile bumper designs that featured integral automotive lighting components such as tail lamps.

In October 1972, the U.S. Congress enacted the Motor Vehicle Information and Cost Saving Act (MVICS), which required NHTSA to issue a bumper standard that yields the "maximum feasible reduction of cost to the public and to the consumer". Factors considered included the costs and benefits of implementation, the standard's effect on insurance costs and legal fees, savings in consumer time and inconvenience, as well as health and safety considerations.

The 1973 model-year passenger cars sold in the U.S. featured a variety of designs. They ranged from non-dynamic versions with solid rubber guards, to "recoverable" designs with oil and nitrogen-filled telescoping shock-absorbers.

The standards were further tightened for the 1974 model year passenger cars, with standardized height front and rear bumpers that could withstand angled impacts at 5 miles per hour (8 km/h) with no damage to the car's lights, safety equipment, and engine. There was no provision in the law for consumers to 'opt out' of this protection.

==== Regulatory effect on design ====
The regulations specified bumper performance; they did not prescribe any particular bumper design. Nevertheless, many cars for the U.S. market were equipped with bulky, massive, protruding bumpers to comply with the 5-mile-per-hour bumper standard in effect from 1973 to 1982. This often meant additional overall vehicle length, as well as new front and rear designs to incorporate the stronger energy-absorbing bumpers, adding weight to the extremities of the vehicle. Passenger cars featured gap-concealing flexible filler panels between the bumpers and the car's bodywork causing them to have a "massive, blockish look". However, other bumper designs also met the requirements. The 1973 AMC Matador coupe had free-standing bumpers with rubber gaiters alone to conceal the retractable shock absorbers. "Endura" bumpers, compliant with the regulations yet tightly integrated into the front bodywork, were used on models such as the Pontiac Grand Am starting in 1973 and the Chevrolet Monte Carlo starting in 1978, with significantly lower mass than heavy chromed-steel bumpers with separate impact energy absorbers.

United States (left) and rest of the world (right)

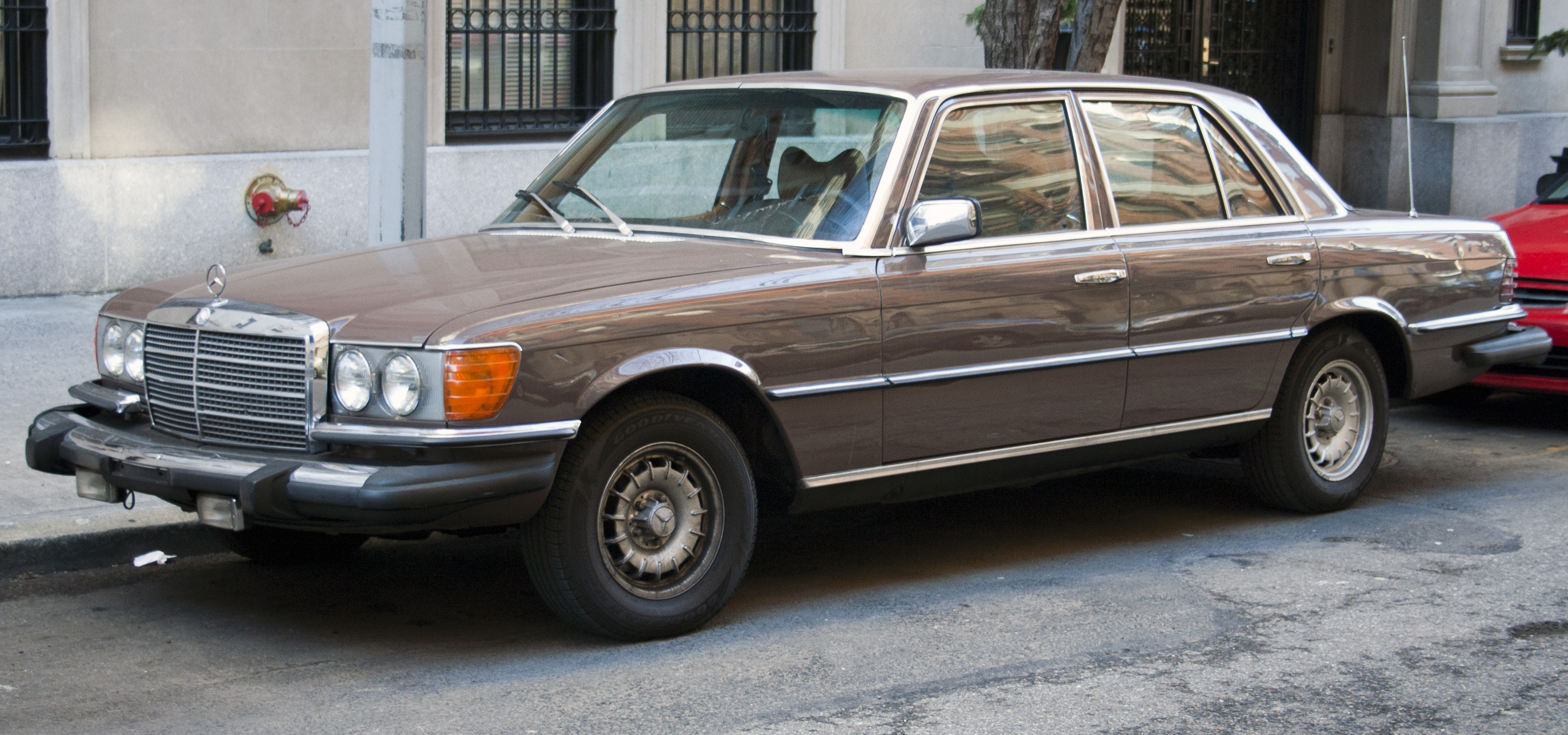

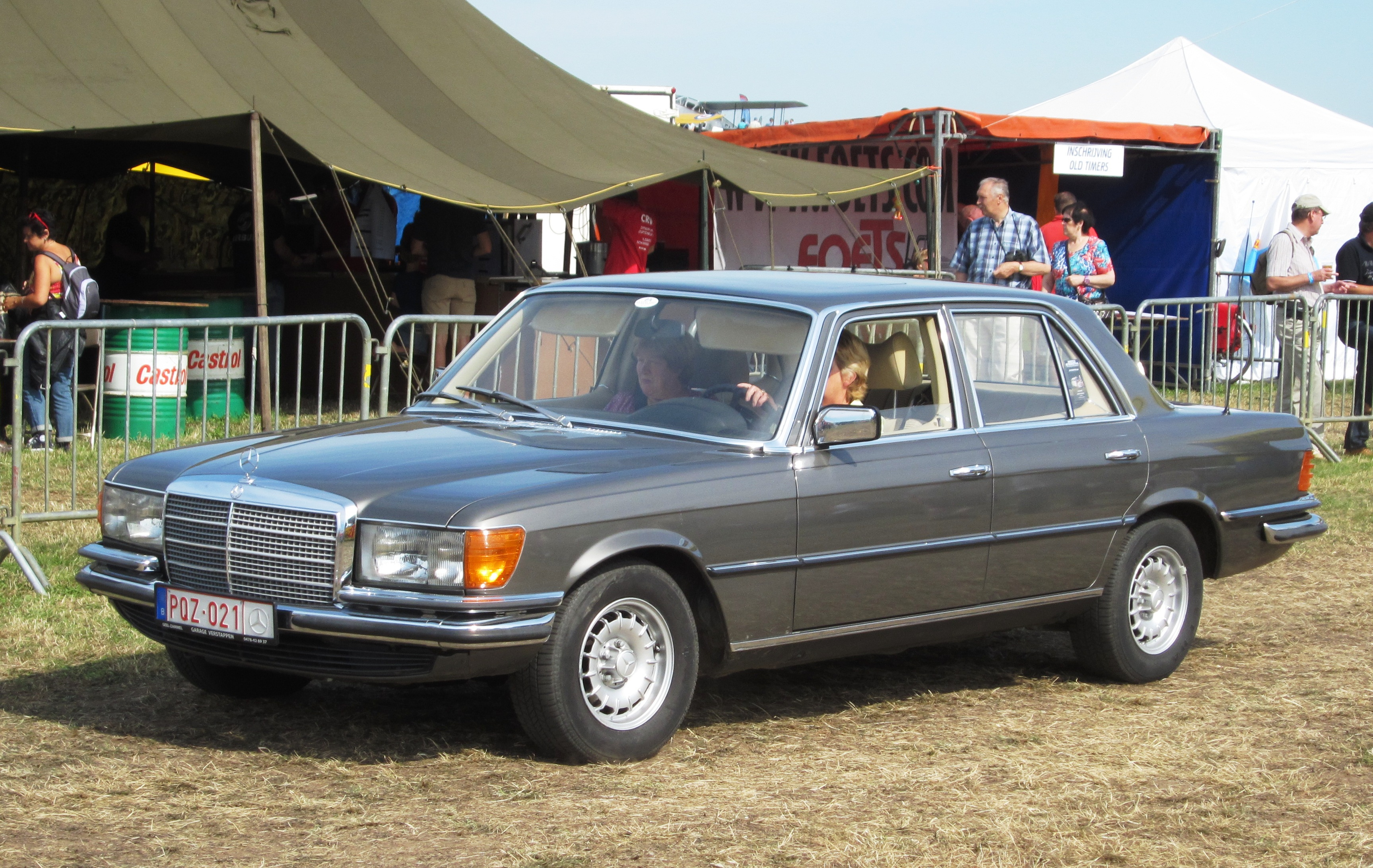

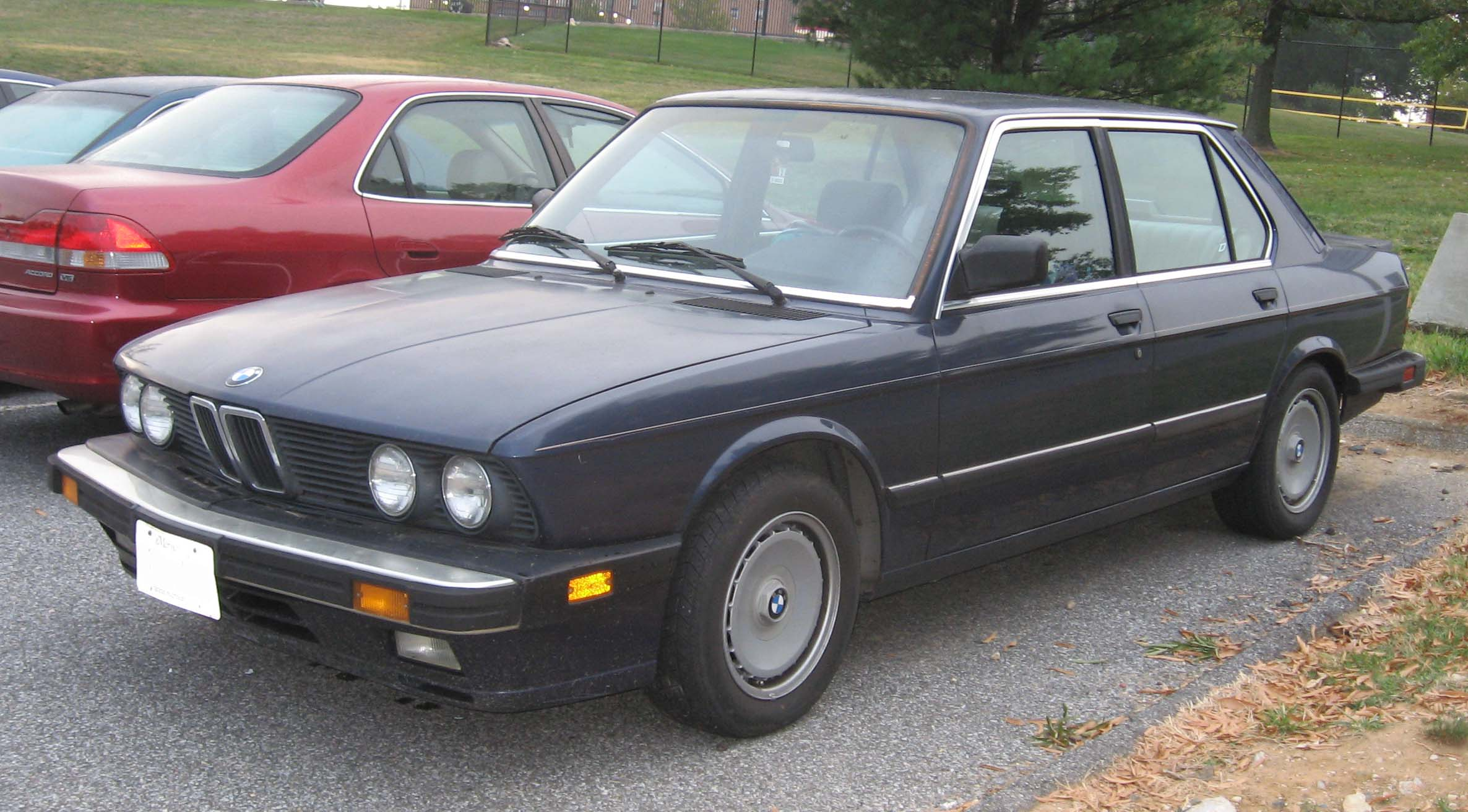

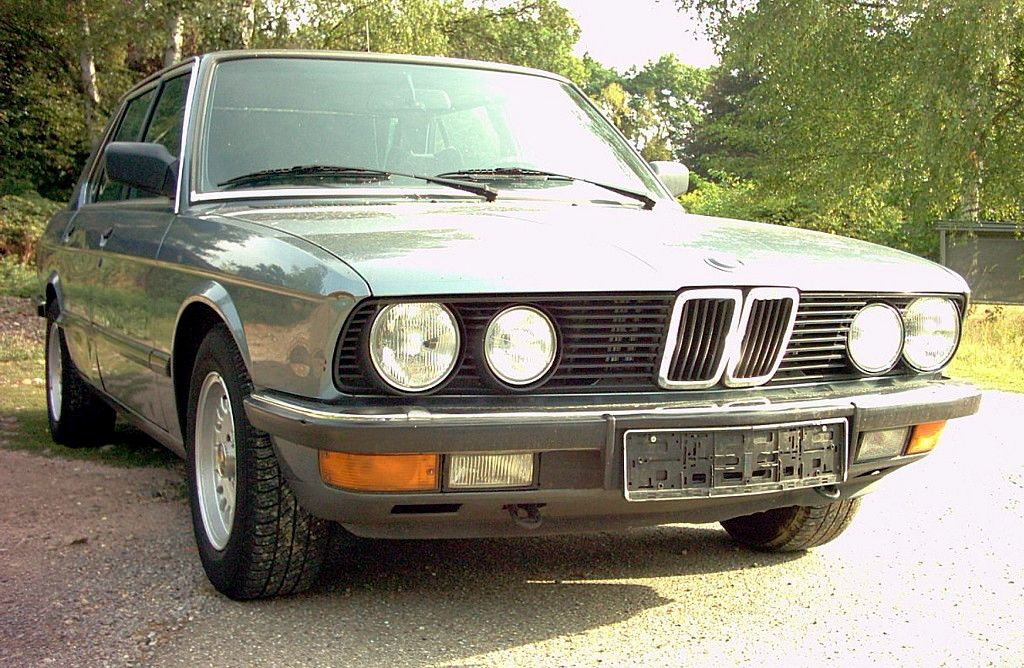

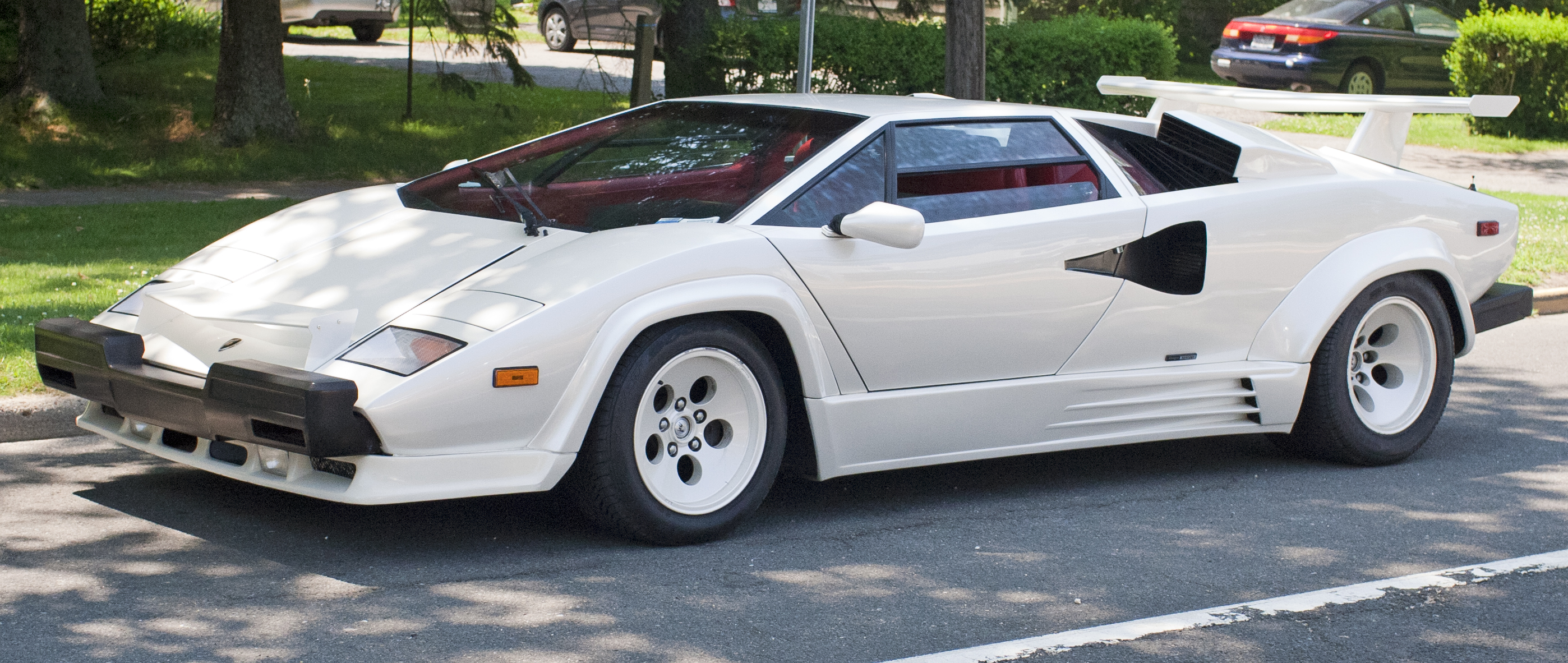

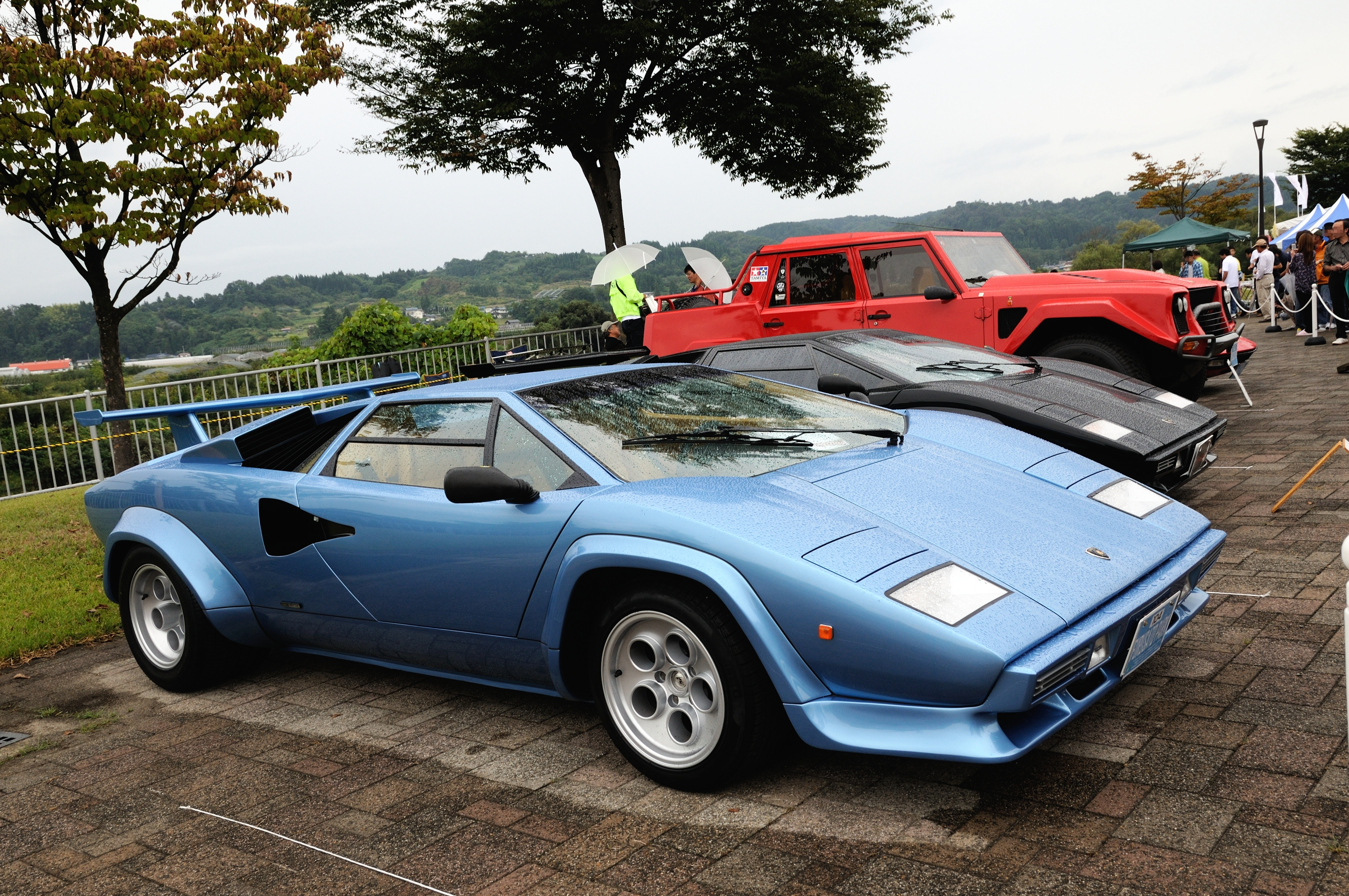

Front bumpers on Mercedes-Benz W116 (top), BMW E28 5 Series (middle), Lamborghini Countach (bottom). The U.S. bumpers are larger and protrude farther from the bodywork.

The bumper regulations applied to all passenger cars, both American-made and imported. With exceptions that included the Volvo 240, Porsche 911, and Rolls-Royce Silver Shadow, the European and Asian automakers incorporated compliant bumpers only on cars destined for the U.S. and Canadian markets. This meant their North American-spec cars tended to look different than versions of the same model sold elsewhere.

U.S. bumper-height requirements effectively made some models, such as the Citroën SM, ineligible for importation to the United States. Unlike international safety regulations, U.S. regulations were written without provision for hydropneumatic suspension.

==== Zero-damage standards 1976 ====
The requirements promulgated under MVICS were consolidated with those of Federal Motor Vehicle Safety Standard Number 215 (FMVSS 215, "Exterior Protection of Vehicles") and were promulgated in March 1976. This new bumper standard was codified in the United States Code of Federal Regulations at 49 CFR 581, separate from the Federal Motor Vehicle Safety Standards at 49 CFR 571. The new requirements, applicable to 1979-model year passenger cars, were called the "Phase I" standard. At the same time, a zero-damage requirement, "Phase II", was enacted for bumper systems on 1980 and newer cars. The most rigorous requirements applied to 1980 through 1982 model vehicles; 5-mile-per-hour (8 km/h) front and rear barrier and pendulum crash tests were required, and no damage was allowed to the bumper beyond a 3/8 in (10 mm) dent and 3/4 in (19 mm) displacement from the bumper's original position.

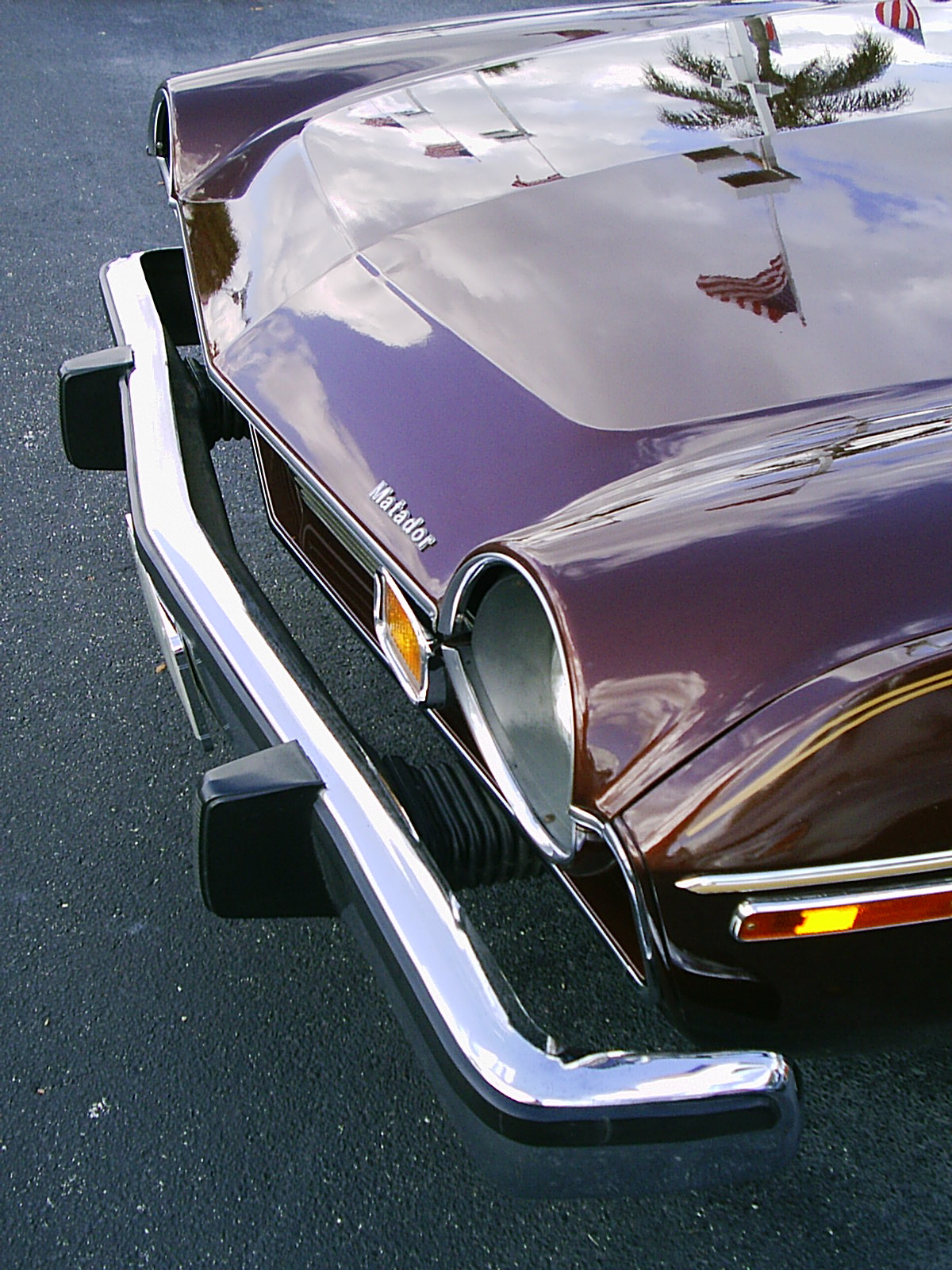
Freestanding 5-mph shock-absorbing zero-damage bumper on 1976 AMC Matador coupe

All-wheel-drive "cross-over" cars such as the AMC Eagle were classified as multi-purpose vehicles or trucks, and thus exempt from the passenger car bumper standards.

==== Stringency reduced in 1982 ====
Safety is not affected much at low speeds, but car owners describe the stronger bumpers lead to fewer, and smaller, repair bills. Furthermore, insurance companies lowered collision coverage rates by 20% for drivers with the robust bumpers. The cost effectiveness of the regulation was evaluated by NHTSA twice under the Carter Administration and found the net saving to consumers ranging from $11 to $39 during the life of the car.

A recently elected Reagan administration pledged to use cost–benefit analysis to reduce regulatory burdens on industry, which impacted this standard.

Before 1959, people believed the stronger the structure, including the bumpers, the safer the car. A later analysis led to the understanding of crumple zones, rather than rigid construction, which was more dangerous to passengers because the force from impact went inside the vehicle and onto the occupants.

The NHTSA amended the bumper standard in May 1982, halving the front and rear crash test speeds for 1983 and newer car bumpers from 5 mph (8 km/h) to 2.5 mph (4 km/h), and the corner crash test speeds from 3 mph (5 km/h) to 1.5 mph (2 km/h). In addition, the zero-damage Phase II requirement was rolled back to the damage allowances of Phase I. At the same time, a passenger car bumper height requirement of 16 to 20 in (41–51 cm) was established for passenger cars.

NHTSA evaluated the results of its change in 1987, noting it resulted in lower weight and manufacturing costs, offset by higher repair costs.

Consumer and insurance groups decried the weakened bumper standard. They argued that the 1982 standard increased overall consumer costs without any attendant benefits except for automakers. In 1986, Consumers Union petitioned NHTSA to return to the Phase II standard and disclose bumper strength information to consumers. In 1990, NHTSA rejected that petition.

==== Consumer information ====
In the United States, the Insurance Institute for Highway Safety (IIHS) subjects vehicles to low-speed barrier tests (6 mph or 9.7 km/h) and publishes the results, including repair costs. Car makers that do well in these tests tend to publicize the results.

In 1990, the IIHS conducted four crash tests on three different-year examples of the Plymouth Horizon. The results illustrate the effect of the changes to the U.S. bumper regulations (repair costs are quoted in 1990 United States dollars):

- 1983 Horizon with Phase-II 5-mph bumpers: $287
- 1983 Horizon with Phase-I 2.5-mph bumpers: $918
- 1990 Horizon: $1,476

==== Bumpers today ====
Today's bumpers are designed to mitigate injuries to pedestrians and minimize weight at the ends of the vehicle, thereby increasing occupant protection from progressive crumpling in a serious accident. They are no longer made of steel and rubber, but of a plastic outer fascia over a lightweight, impact-absorbing polystyrene foam core.

=== Canada ===
Automobile bumper standards in Canada were first enacted simultaneously as with those in the United States. These were closely similar to the 8 km/h (5 mph) U.S. regulation, and the Canadian requirements were not lowered to 4 km/h (2.5 mph) in 1982 as was done in the United States.

Some automakers provided stronger Canadian-specification bumpers across North America, while others used weaker bumpers in the U.S. market. This limited the import of grey vehicles between the U.S. and Canada.

In early 2009, Canada's regulations shifted to harmonize with U.S. Federal standards and international UN Regulations. As in the U.S., consumer protection groups opposed the change, while Canadian regulators maintained that the 4 km/h (2.5 mph) test speed is used worldwide and is more compatible with improved pedestrian protection in vehicle-pedestrian crashes.

== See also ==
- Automobile safety
- Buffer (rail transport)
- Fender (boating)
- Bumper sticker
- Cost–benefit analysis
- Crashworthiness
- Government failure
- Headstock
- List of auto parts
