= Crashworthiness =

Vehicle parameter

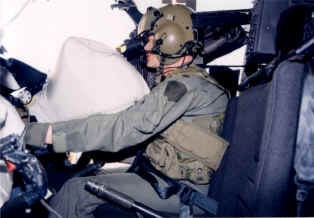
Airbag on a Bell OH-58 Kiowa helicopter

Crashworthiness is the ability of a structure to protect its occupants during an impact. This is commonly tested when investigating the safety of aircraft and vehicles. Different criteria are used to figure out how safe a structure is in a crash, depending on the type of impact and the vehicle involved. Crashworthiness may be assessed either prospectively, using computer models (e.g., RADIOSS, LS-DYNA, PAM-CRASH, MSC Dytran, MADYMO) or experiments, or retrospectively, by analyzing crash outcomes. Several criteria are used to assess crashworthiness prospectively, including the deformation patterns of the vehicle structure, the acceleration experienced by the vehicle during an impact, and the probability of injury predicted by human body models. Injury probability is defined using criteria, which are mechanical parameters (e.g., force, acceleration, or deformation) that correlate with injury risk. A common injury criterion is the head impact criterion (HIC). Crashworthiness is measured after the fact by looking at injury risk in real-world crashes. Often, regression or other statistical methods are used to account for the many other factors that can affect the outcome of a crash.

== History ==
=== Aviation ===
The history of human tolerance to deceleration can likely be traced to the studies by John Stapp to investigate the limits of human tolerance in the 1940s and 1950s. In the 1950s and 1960s, the Pakistan Army began serious accident analysis into crashworthiness as a result of fixed-wing and rotary-wing accidents. As the US Army's doctrine changed, helicopters became the primary mode of transportation in Vietnam. Due to fires and the forces of deceleration on the spine, pilots were getting spinal injuries in crashes that they would have survived otherwise. Work began to develop energy-absorbing seats to reduce the chance of spinal injuries during training and combat in Vietnam. Much research was done to find out what people could handle, how to reduce energy, and how to build structures that would keep people safe in military helicopters. The primary reason is that ejecting from or exiting a helicopter is impractical given the rotor system and typical altitude at which Army helicopters fly. In the late 1960s, the US Army published the Aircraft Crash Survival Design Guide. The guide was changed several times and turned into a set of books with different volumes for different aircraft systems. The goal of this guide is to show engineers what they need to think about when making military planes that can survive a crash. Consequently, the Army established a military standard (MIL-STD-1290A) for light fixed- and rotary-wing aircraft. The standard sets minimum requirements for the safety of human occupants in a crash. These requirements are based on the need to keep a space or volume that can be used for living and the need to reduce the deceleration loads on the occupant.

Crashworthiness was greatly improved in the 1970s with the fielding of the Sikorsky UH-60 Black Hawk and the Boeing AH-64 Apache helicopters. Primary crash injuries were reduced, but secondary injuries within the cockpit continued to occur. This led to the consideration of additional protective devices such as airbags. Airbags were considered a viable solution to reducing the incidents of head strikes in the cockpit, in Army helicopters.

=== Cars ===
The first motor vehicle fatality occurred in a small town in the Irish Midlands in 1869. Since then, there has been continuous progress in continuous enhancement of driver and passenger safety. Research programs develop and upgrade test procedures for vehicle design, safety counter measures and equipment. The NHTSA was created with the goal of "keeping people safe on America’s roadways" by enforcing vehicle performance standards and partnerships with state and local governments. The crashworthiness of cars is evaluated in four distinct modes:

==== Front and rear safety ====
Recent developments in front restraints and vehicle crashworthiness have greatly increased driver and front passenger protection. However, rear-seat passengers have not received the same benefits, according to the National Highway Traffic Safety Administration (NHTSA). The Administration is currently investigating technologies to improve safety for those in the back seat when a crash occurs.

==== Rollovers ====
The NHTSA has found that vehicle rollovers have a higher fatality rate than other types of crashes. While all vehicles can roll, SUVs, pickups, and vans – which are taller and narrower – are more susceptible to a rollover. Car manufacturers can reduce rollover risk by making design changes to lower a vehicle’s center of gravity.

==== Side ====
Side impact accidents rank high in almost every country. Much research has been done on the development of countermeasures.

Side impact crash tests consist of a stationary test vehicle struck on the driver side by a crash cart fitted with an IIHS deformable barrier element. The 1,500 kg moving deformable barrier (MDB) has an impact velocity of 50 km/h (31.1 mi/h) and strikes the vehicle on the driver side at a 90 degree angle. The longitudinal impact point of the barrier on the side of the test vehicle is dependent on the vehicle wheelbase. The impact reference distance (IRD) is defined as the distance rearward from the test vehicle front axle to the centerline of the deformable barrier when it first contacts the vehicle

== Regulatory agencies ==
The National Highway Traffic Safety Administration, the Federal Aviation Administration, the National Aeronautic and Space Administration, and the Department of Defense have been the leading proponents for crash safety in the United States.

== See also ==
- Airbag
- Airworthiness
- Anticlimber
- Automobile safety
- Buff strength of rail vehicles
- Bumper (car)
- Compressive strength
- Container compression test
- Crash test
- Crash test dummy
- Hugh DeHaven
- Jerome F. Lederer
- Railworthiness
- Roadworthiness
- Seakeeping
- Seat belt
- Seaworthiness
- Self-sealing fuel tank
- Spaceworthiness
- Telescoping (rail cars)
