= Out of position =

Out of position may refer to:

- The position in poker of a player to opponents acting after him.
- Out of position (crash testing), a passenger position which is not the normal one.
- Out of Position, a novel by Kyell Gold
