= Crash test =

Form of destructive testing

A crash test of the Honda Ridgeline by the NHTSA

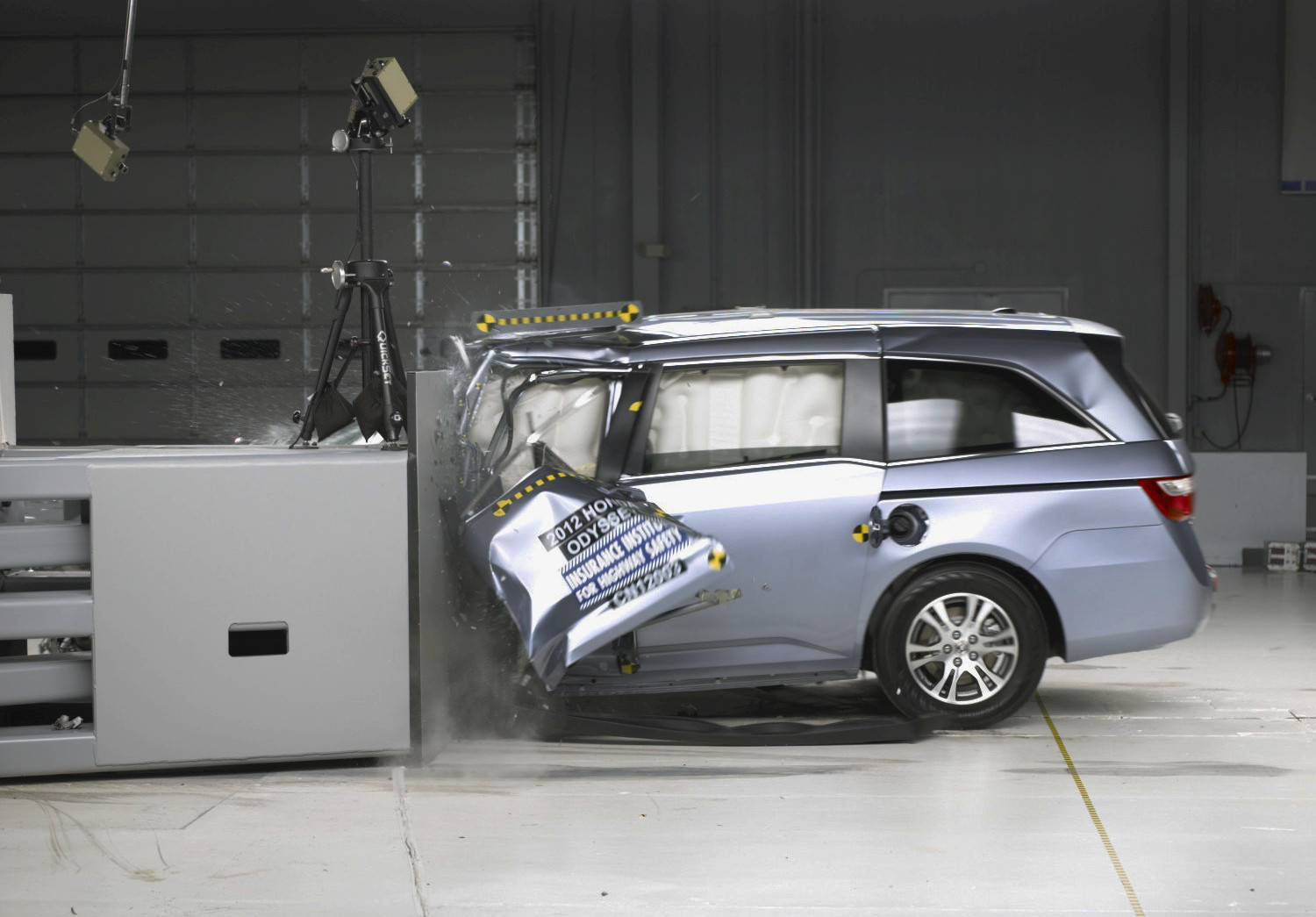
Frontal small-overlap crash test of a 2012 Honda Odyssey

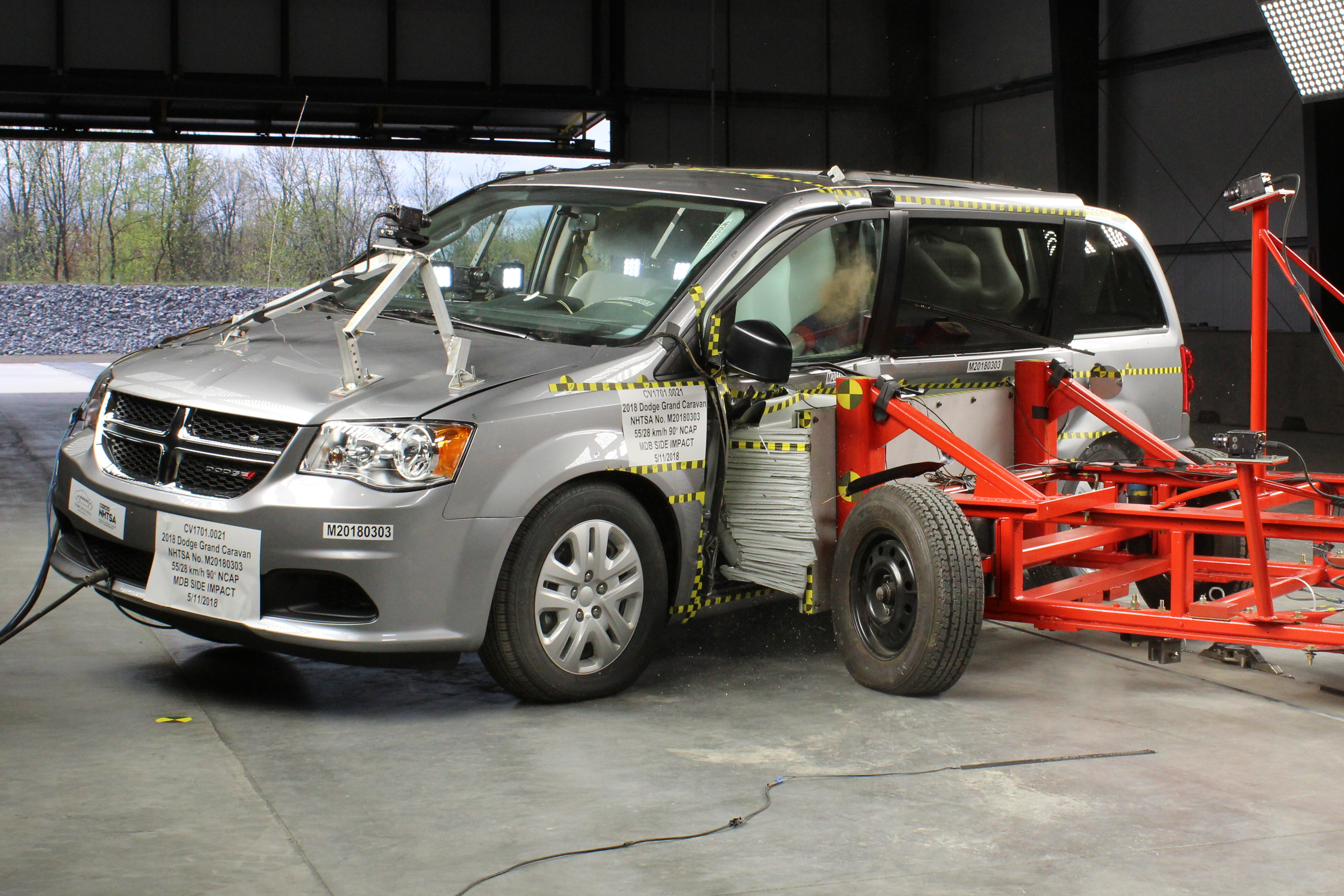
2018 Dodge Grand Caravan being struck by a mobile deformable barrier at 62 km/h

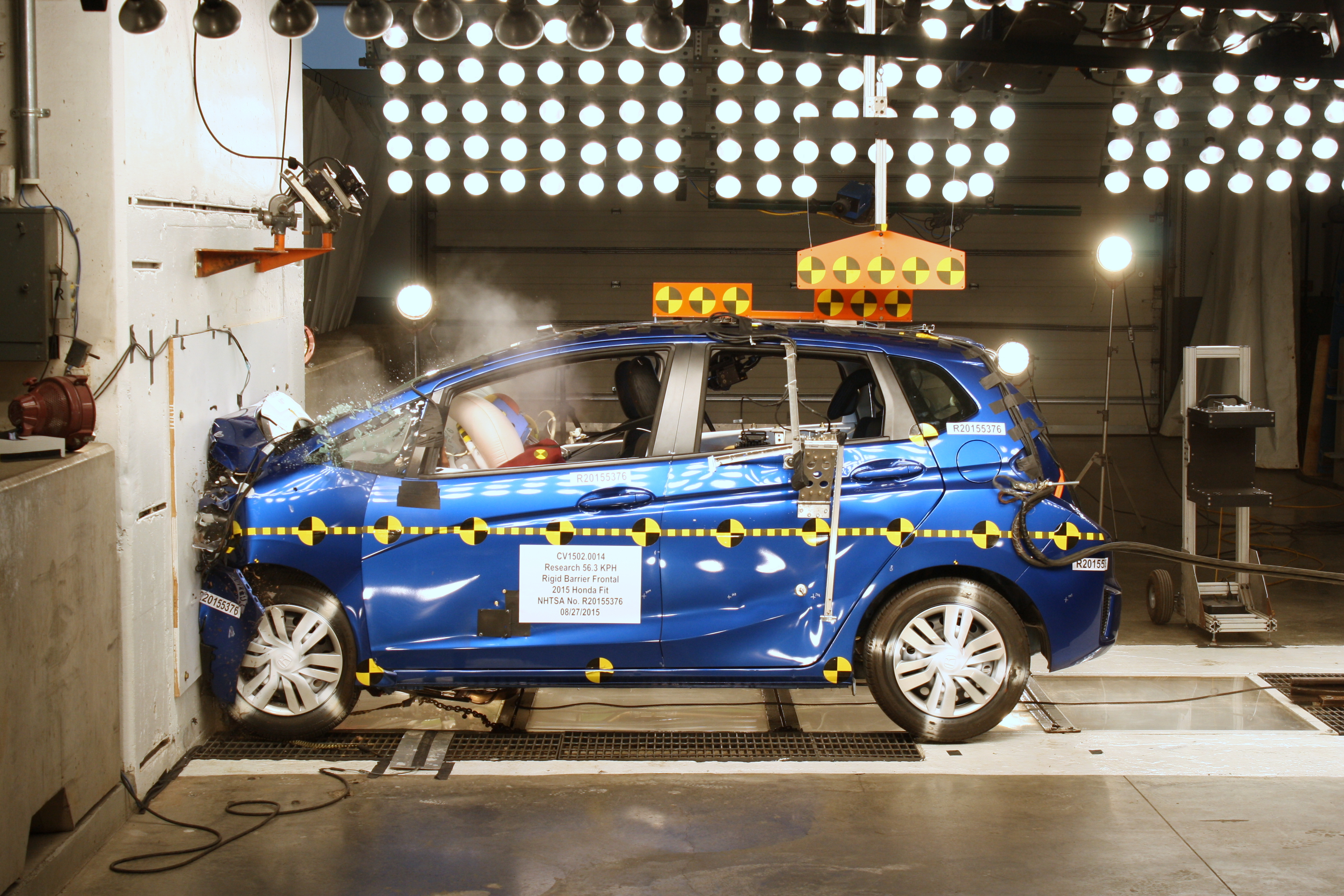
2016 Honda Fit striking a wall head-on at 56 km/h

Driver-side oblique crash test of a 2017 Honda Ridgeline

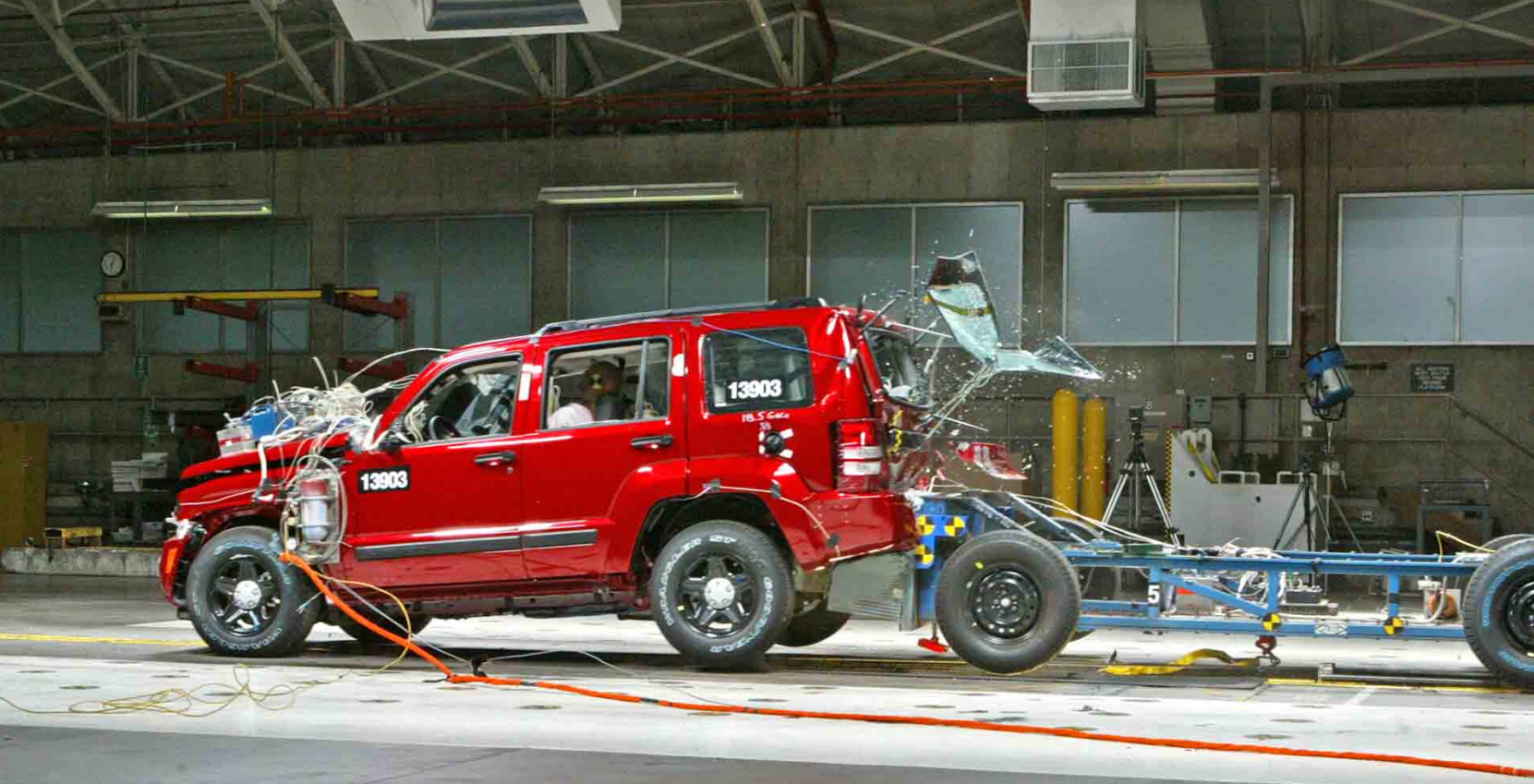
Jeep Liberty undergoing routine impact testing at Chrysler's Proving Grounds

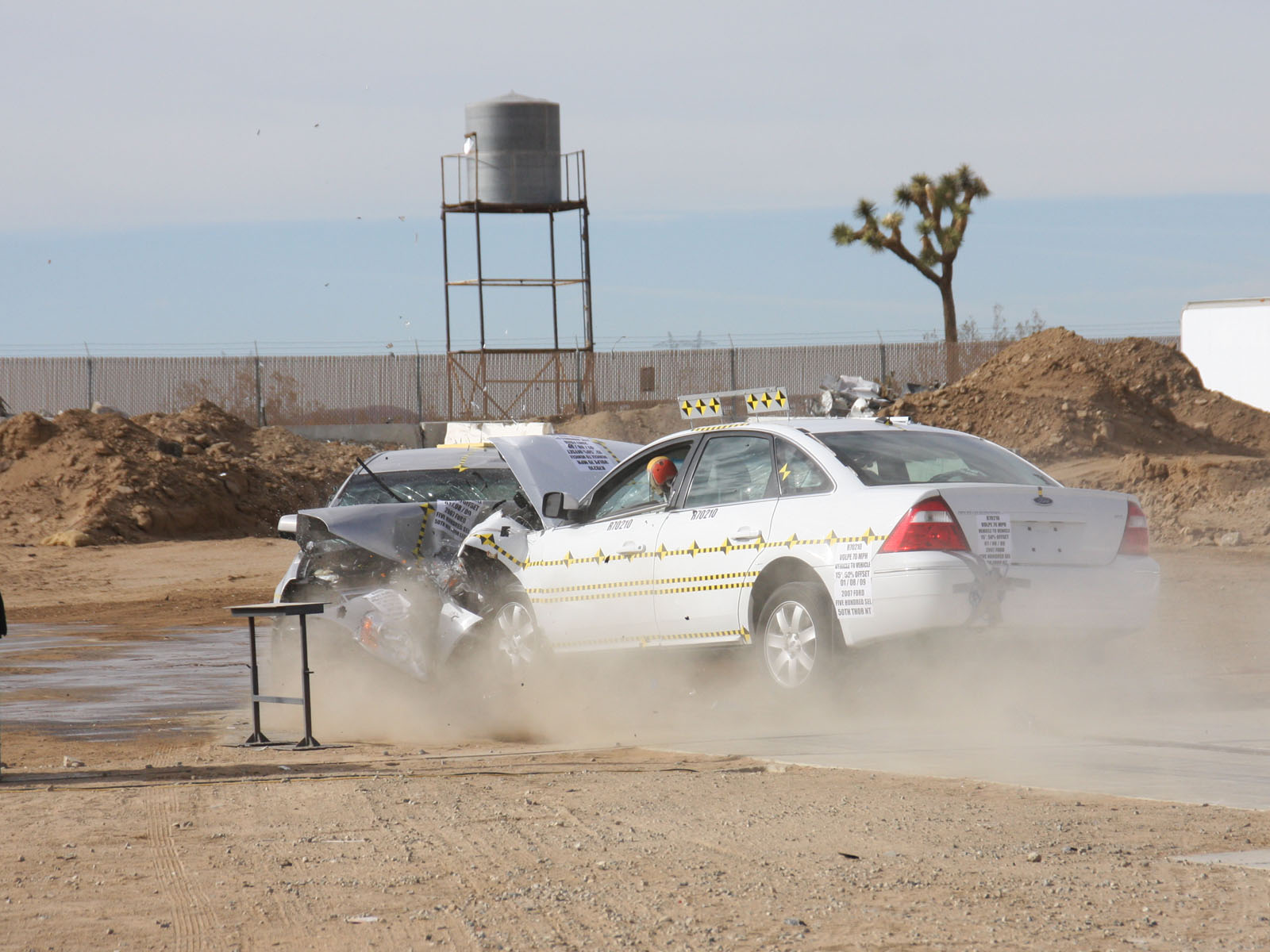
NHTSA research crash test involving two Ford Five Hundreds

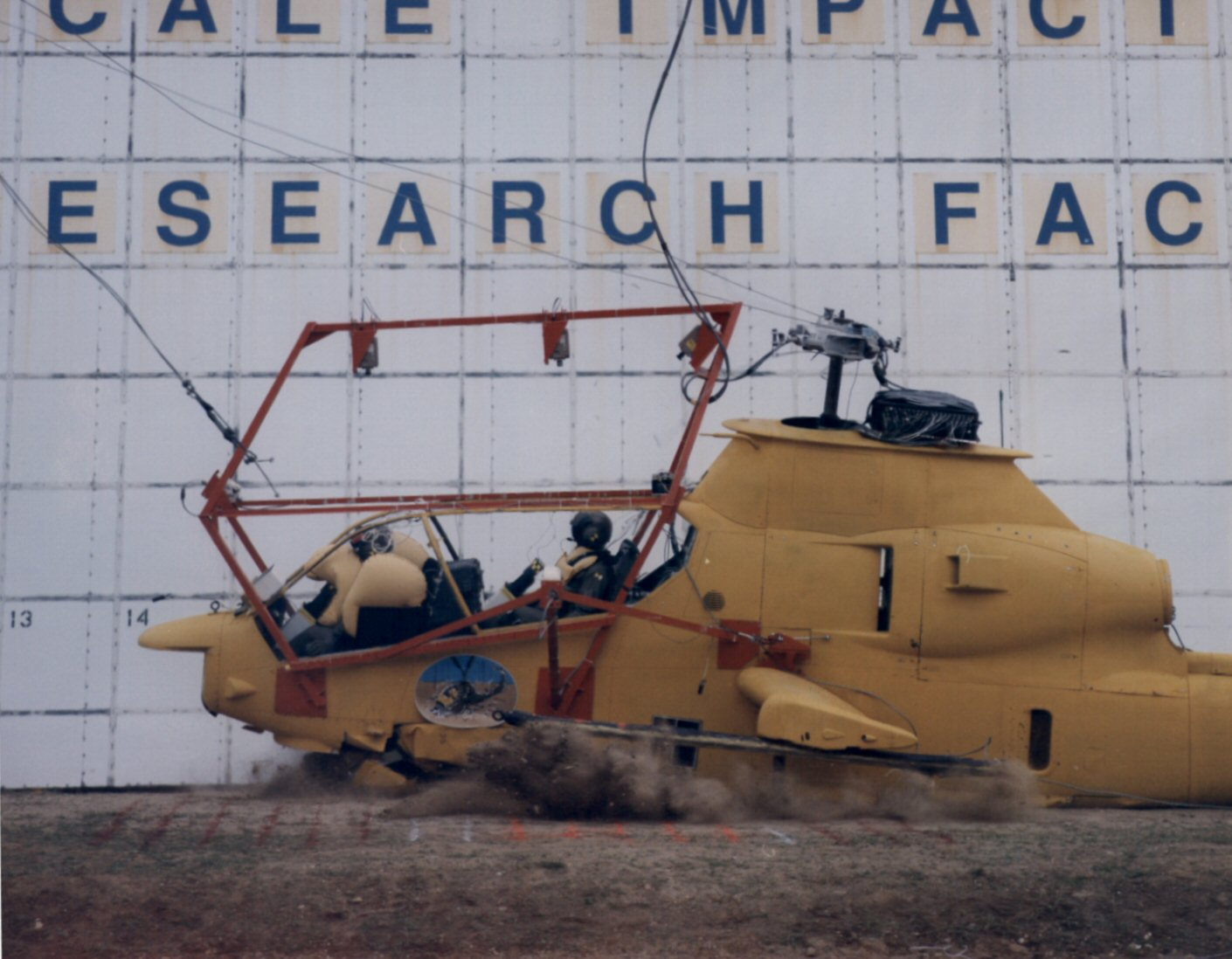
Full-scale crash test of various airbag technologies on an AH-1G (Mod) helicopter

A crash test is a form of destructive testing usually performed in order to ensure safe design standards in crashworthiness and crash compatibility for various modes of transportation (see automobile safety) or related systems and components.

== Types ==
- Frontal-impact tests: which is what most people initially think of when asked about a crash test. Vehicles usually impact a solid concrete wall at a specified speed, but these can also be vehicle impacting vehicle tests. SUVs have been singled out in these tests for a while, due to the high ride-height that they often have.
- Moderate Overlap tests: in which only part of the front of the car impacts with a barrier (vehicle). These are important, as impact forces (approximately) remain the same as with a frontal impact test, but a smaller fraction of the car is required to absorb all of the force. These tests are often realized by cars turning into oncoming traffic. This type of testing is done by the U.S.A. Insurance Institute for Highway Safety (IIHS), Euro NCAP, Australasian New Car Assessment Program (ANCAP) and ASEAN NCAP.
- Small Overlap tests: this is where only a small portion of the car's structure strikes an object such as a pole or a tree, or if a car were to clip another car. This is the most demanding test because it loads the most force onto the structure of the car at any given speed. These are usually conducted at 15–20% of the front vehicle structure.
- Side-impact tests: these forms of accidents have a very significant likelihood of fatality, as cars do not have a significant crumple zone to absorb the impact forces before an occupant is injured.
- Pole-impact tests: A difficult test which places a large amount of force on a small proportion on the side of the vehicle.
- Roll-over tests: which tests a car's ability (specifically the pillars holding the roof) to support itself in a dynamic impact. More recently, dynamic rollover tests have been proposed in lieu of static crush testing (video).
- Roadside hardware crash tests: are used to ensure crash barriers and crash cushions will protect vehicle occupants from roadside hazards, and also to ensure that guard rails, sign posts, light poles and similar appurtenances do not pose an undue hazard to vehicle occupants.
- Old versus new: Often an old and big car against a small and new car, or two different generations of the same car model. These tests are performed to show the advancements in crash-worthiness.
- Computer model: Because of the cost of full-scale crash tests, engineers often run many simulated crash tests using computer models to refine their vehicle or barrier designs before conducting live tests.
- Sled testing: A cost-effective way of testing components such as airbags and seat belts is conducting sled crash testing. The two most common types of sled systems are reverse-firing sleds which are fired from a standstill, and decelerating sleds which are accelerated from a starting point and stopped in the crash area with a hydraulic ram. It can also be used to evaluate the whiplash protection of a vehicle's seat.
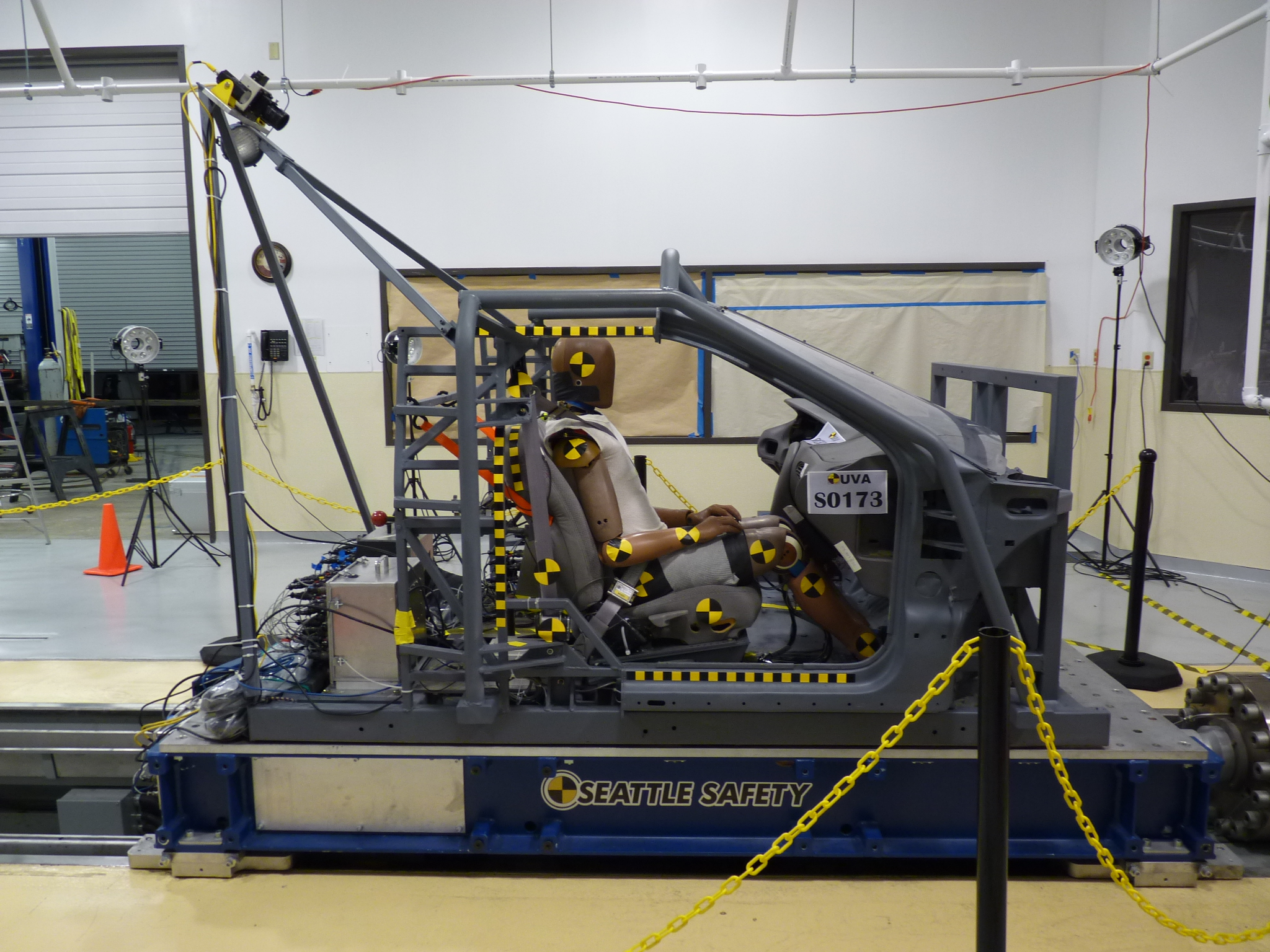
A reverse-firing sled with a buck representing a conventional sedan prior to a run

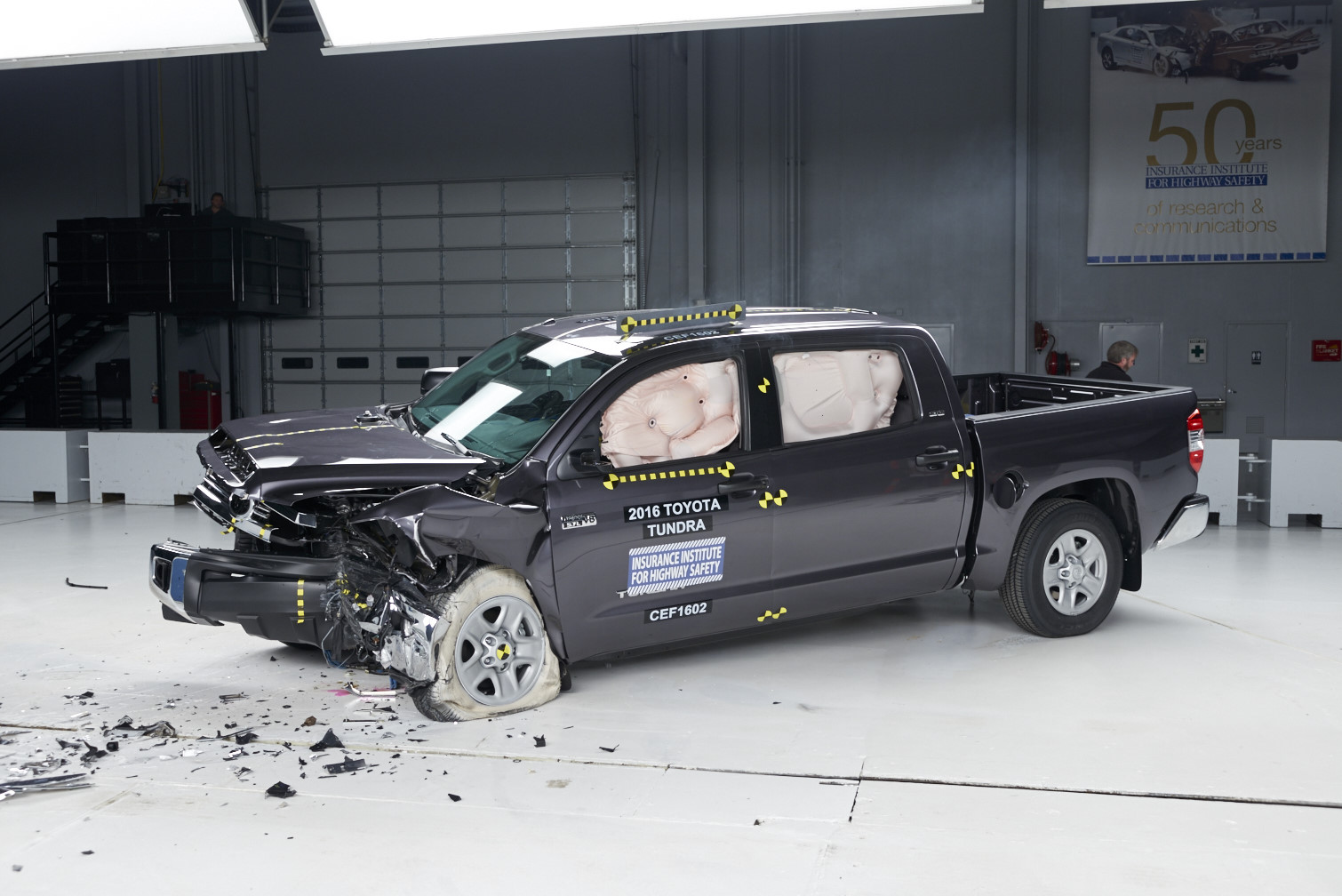
Frontal moderate overlap crash test of a 2016 Toyota Tundra

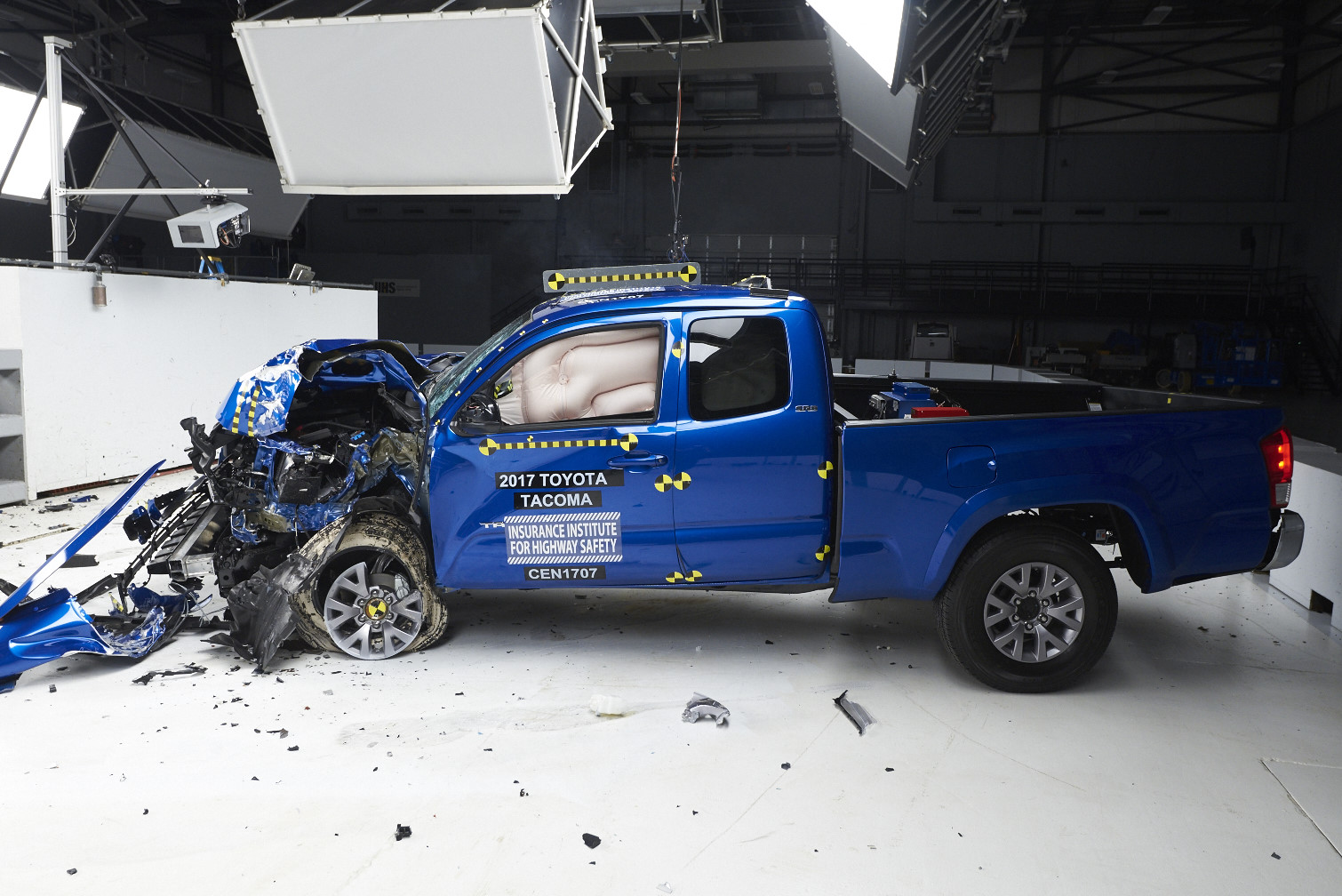
Driver-side small overlap crash test of a 2017 Toyota Tacoma

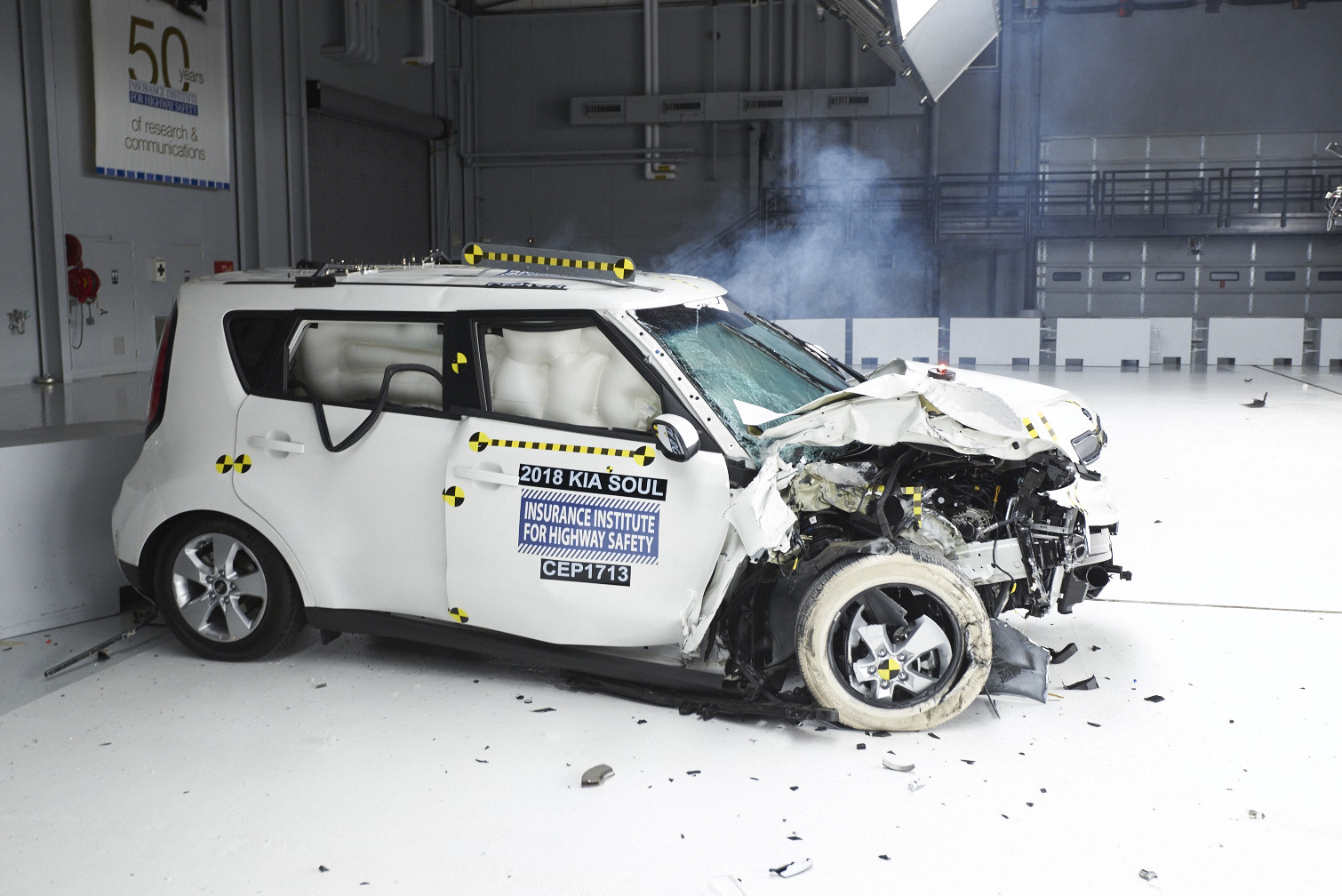
Passenger-side small overlap crash test of a 2018 Kia Soul

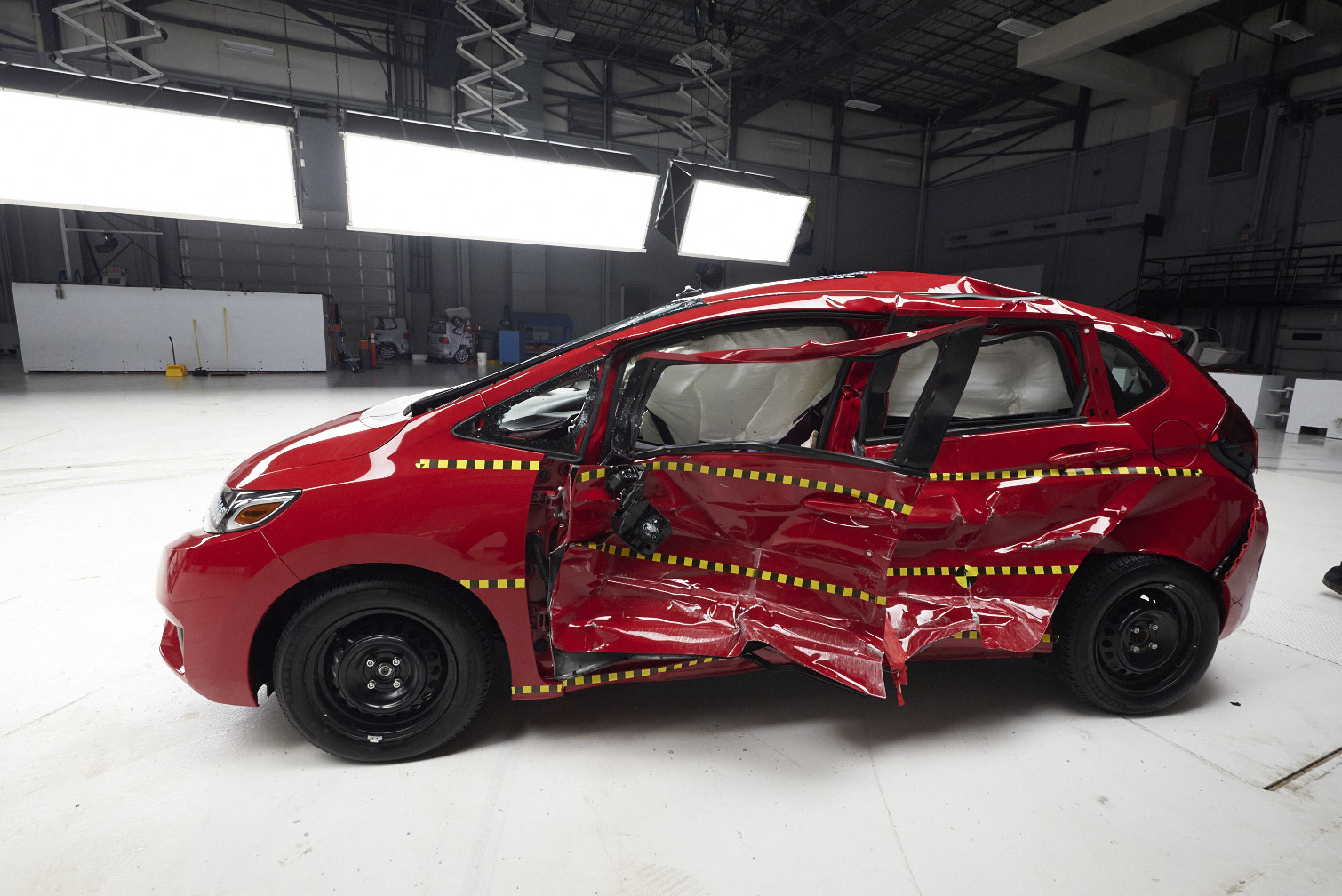
Side impact crash test of a 2016 Honda Fit

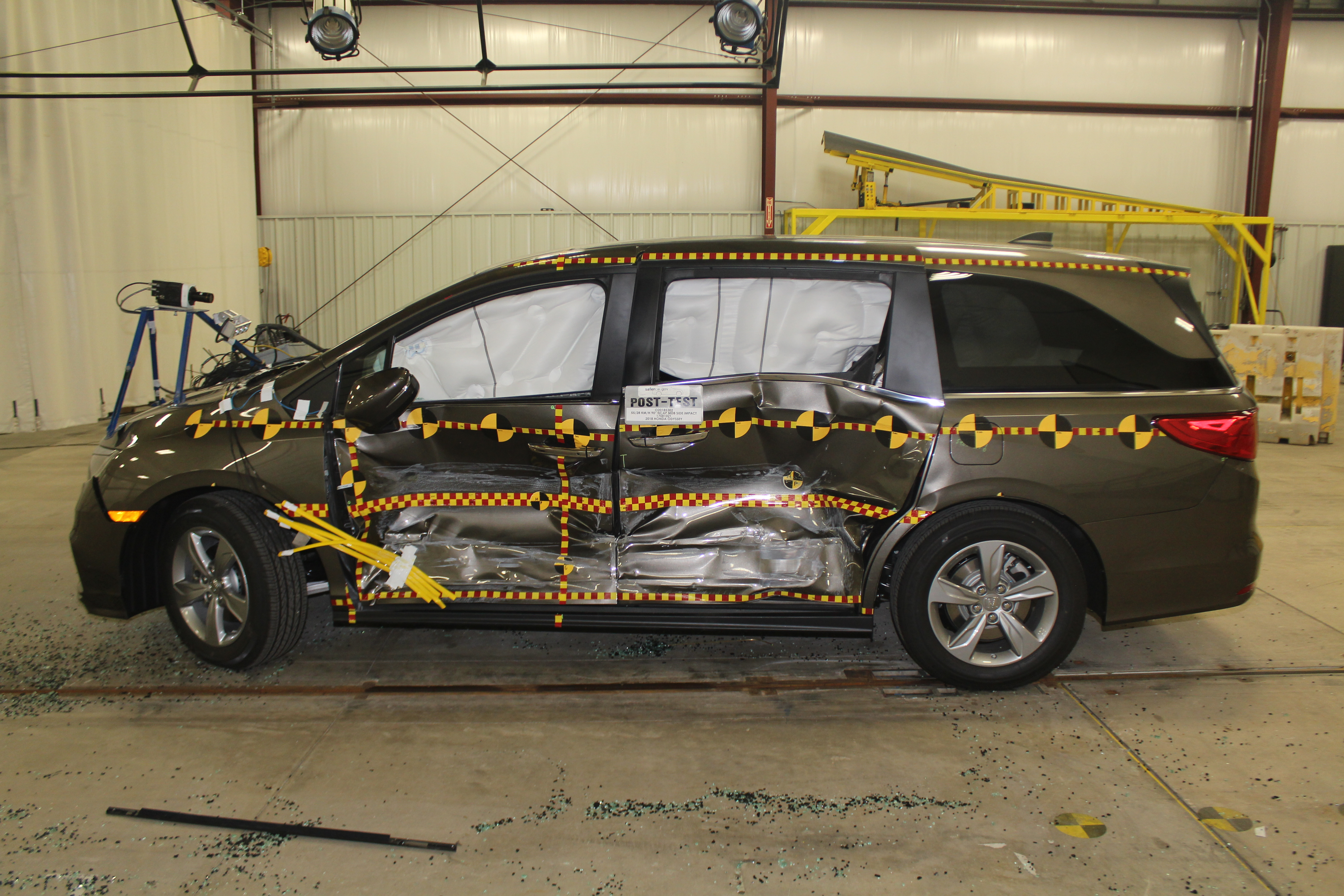
Side impact crash test of a 2018 Honda Odyssey

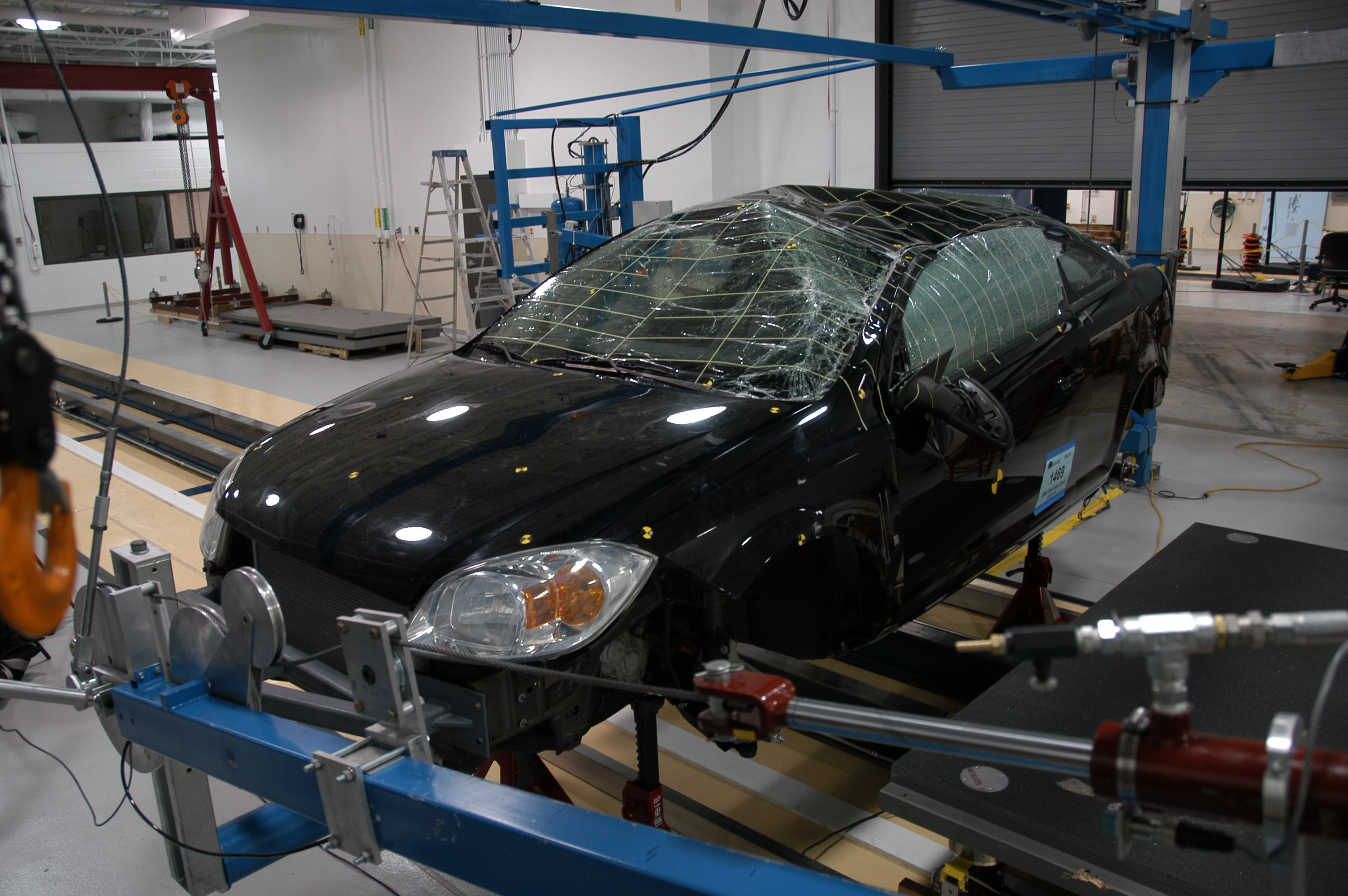
Rollover crash test of a 2006 Chevrolet Cobalt SS

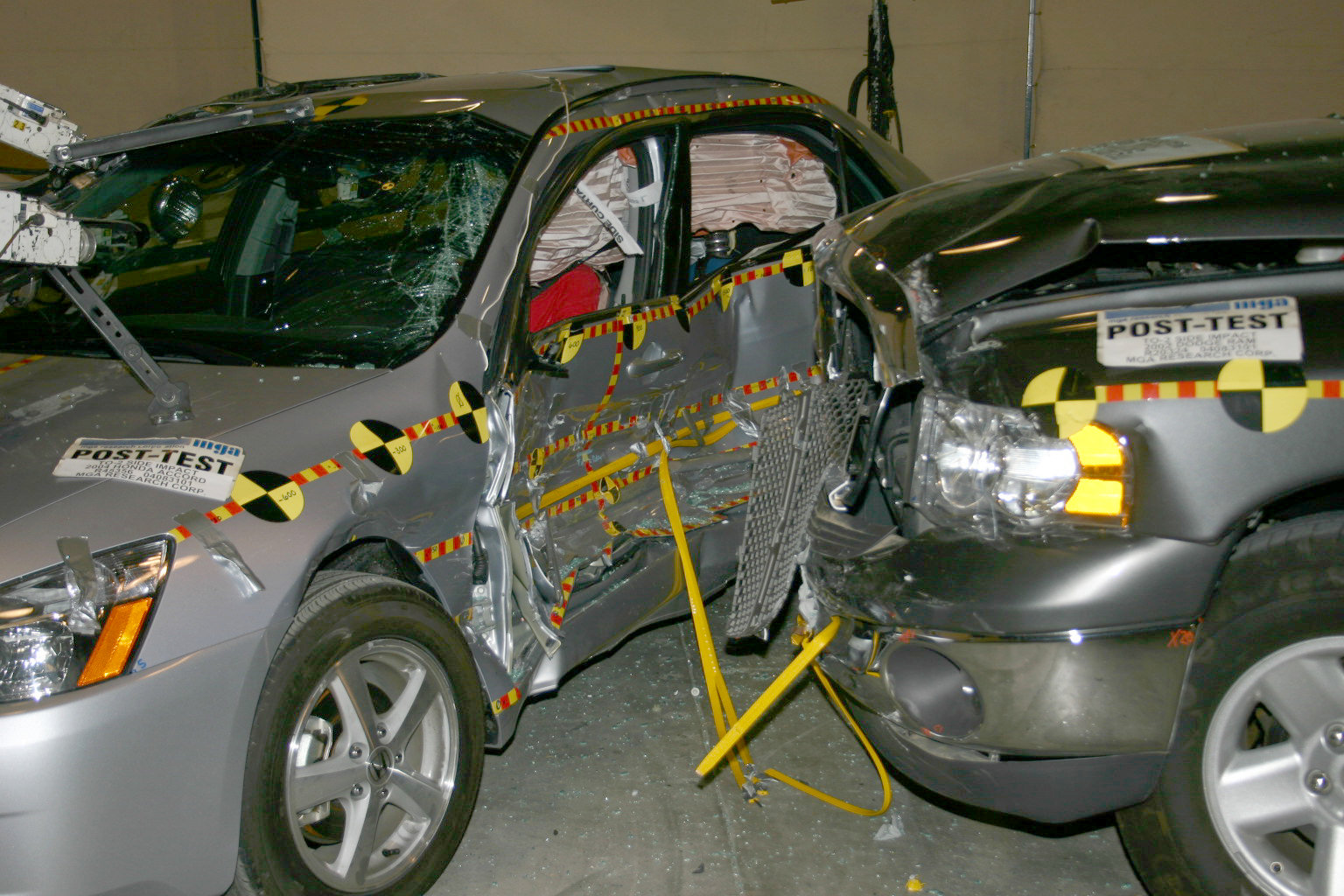
Side-impact crash test of a 2002 Dodge Ram 1500 striking a 2004 Honda Accord mid-size sedan

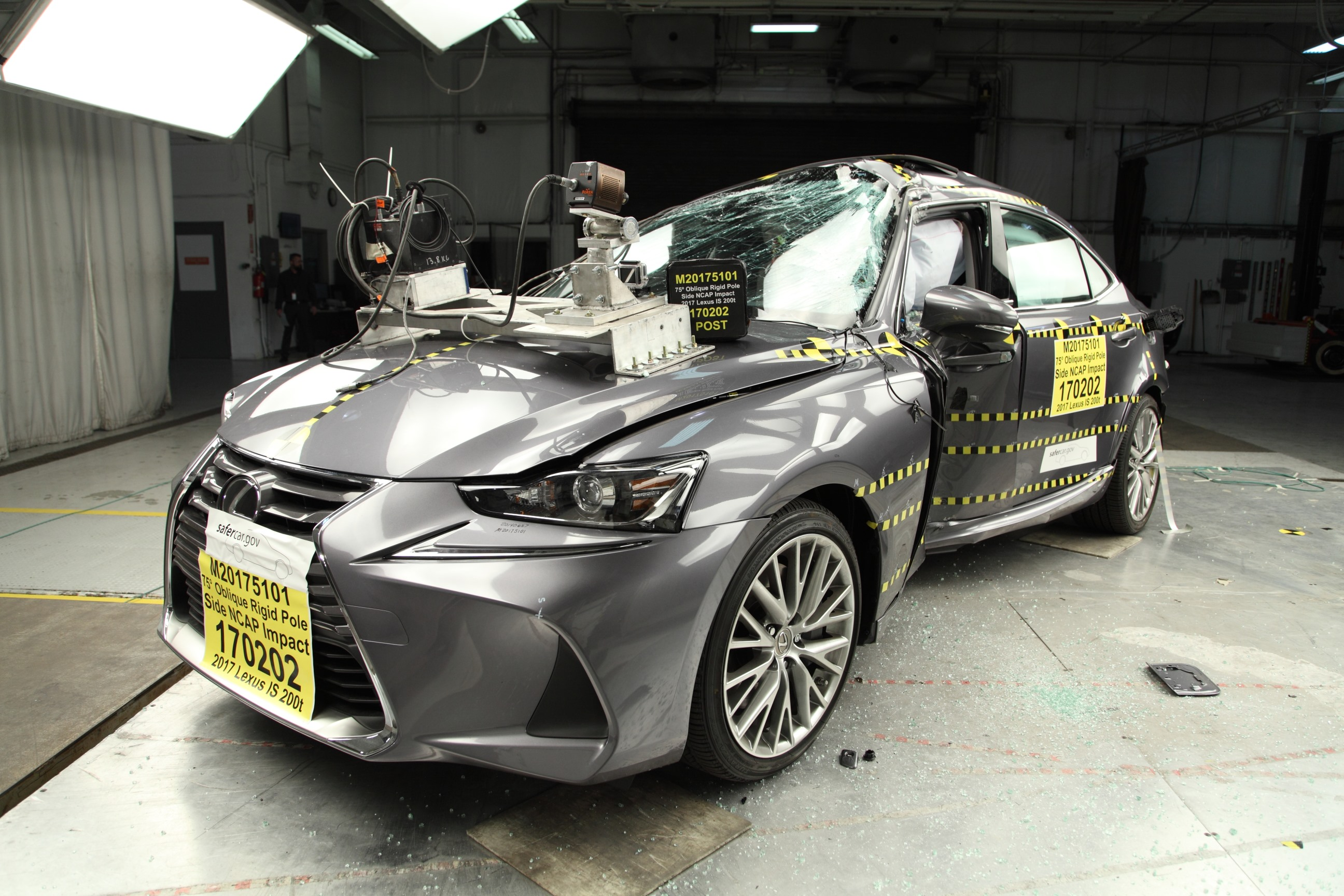
Side pole impact crash test of a 2017 Lexus IS

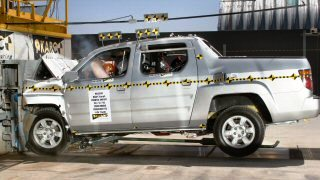
Front full-width crash test of a 2006 Honda Ridgeline

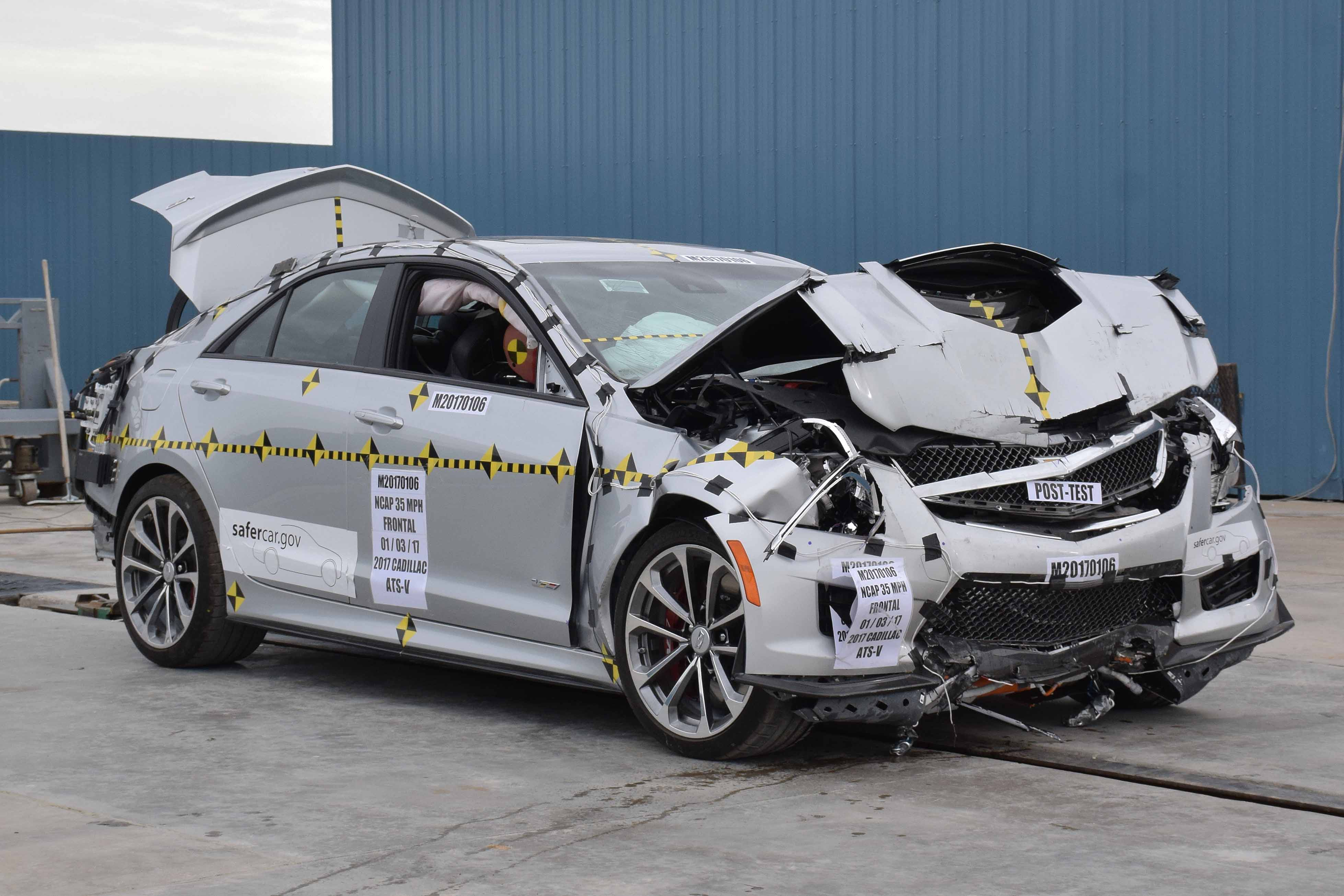
Frontal full-width crash test of a 2017 Cadillac ATS-V

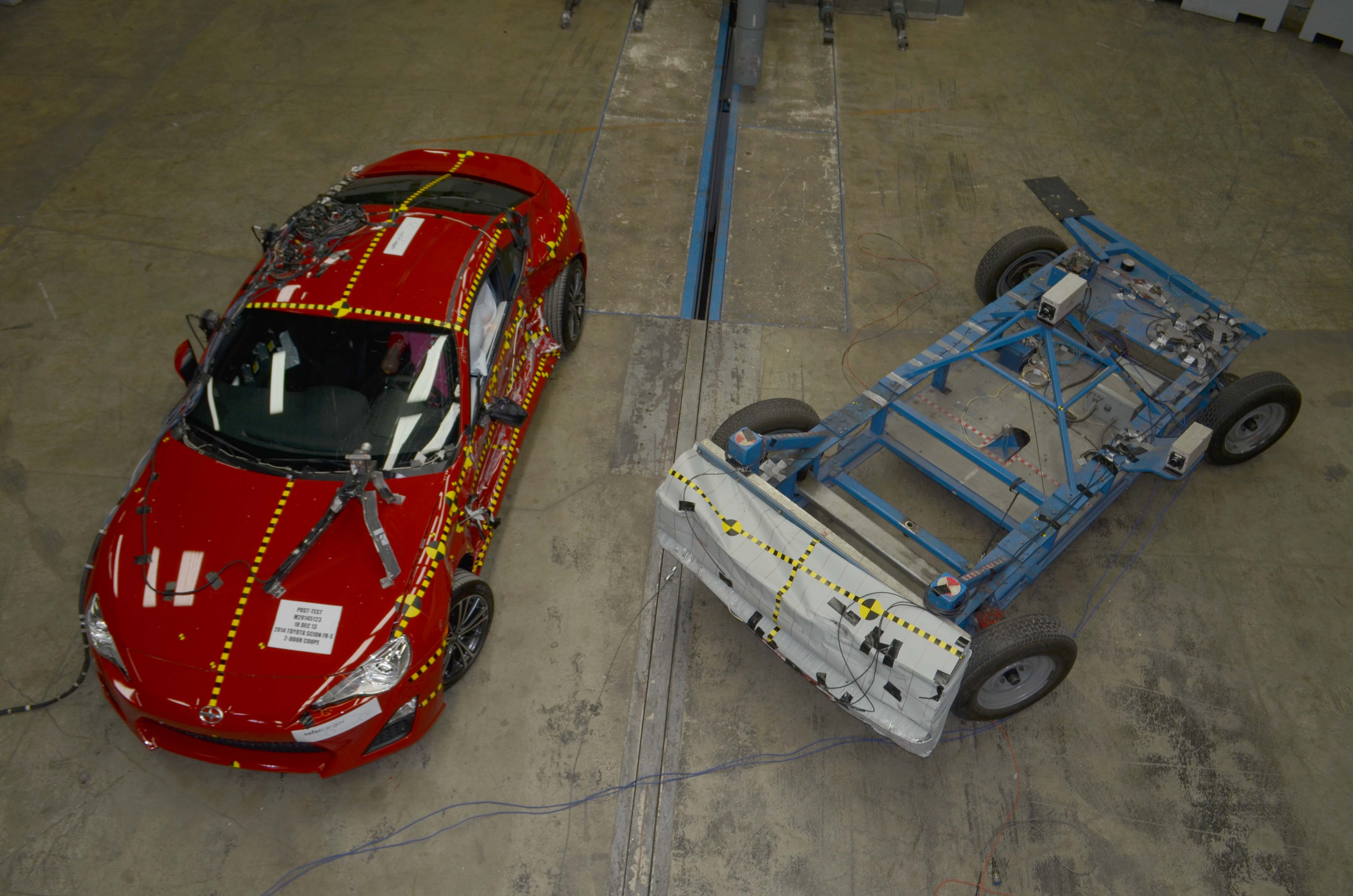
Side impact crash test of a 2014 Scion FR-S

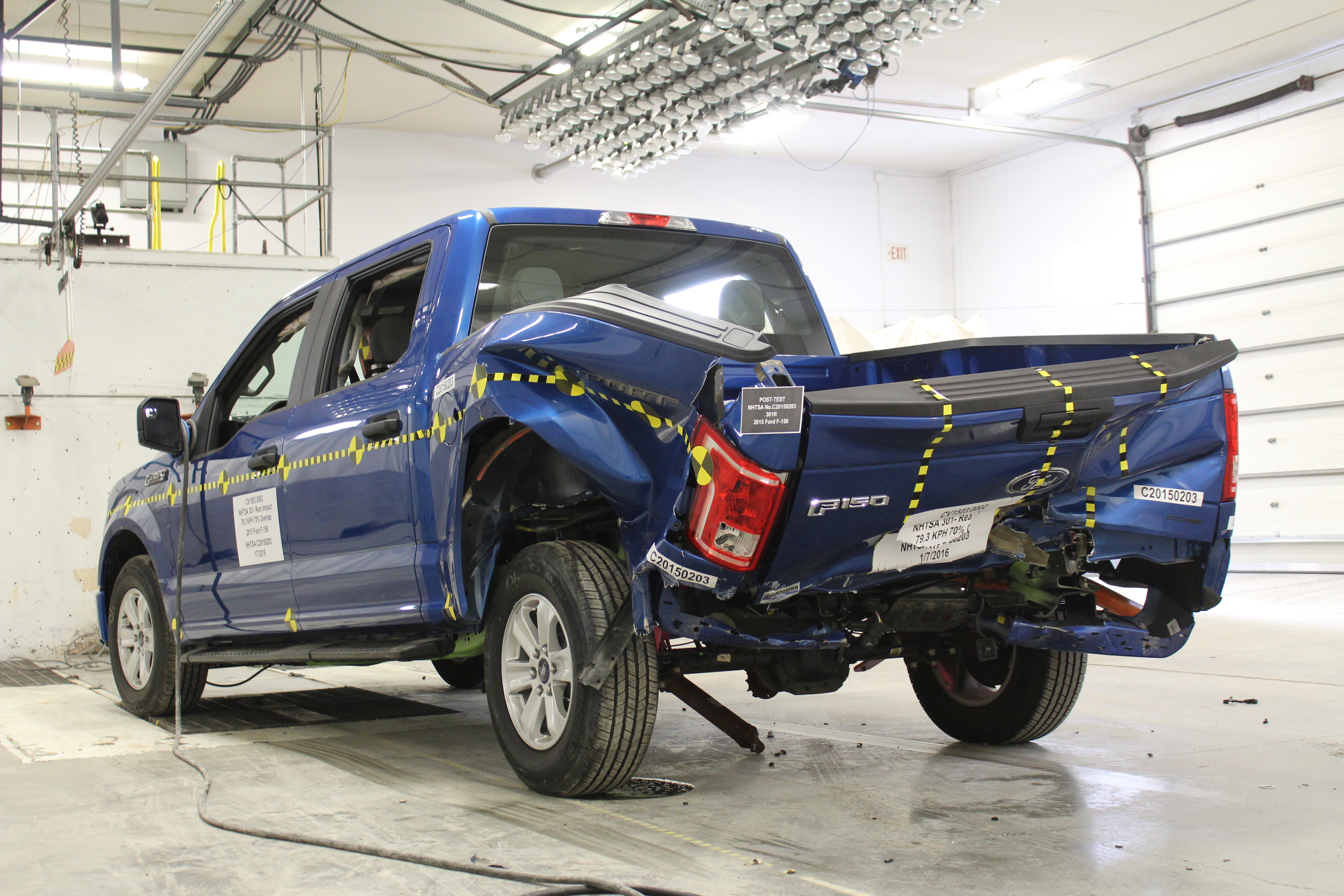
Rear offset impact of a 2015 Ford F-150

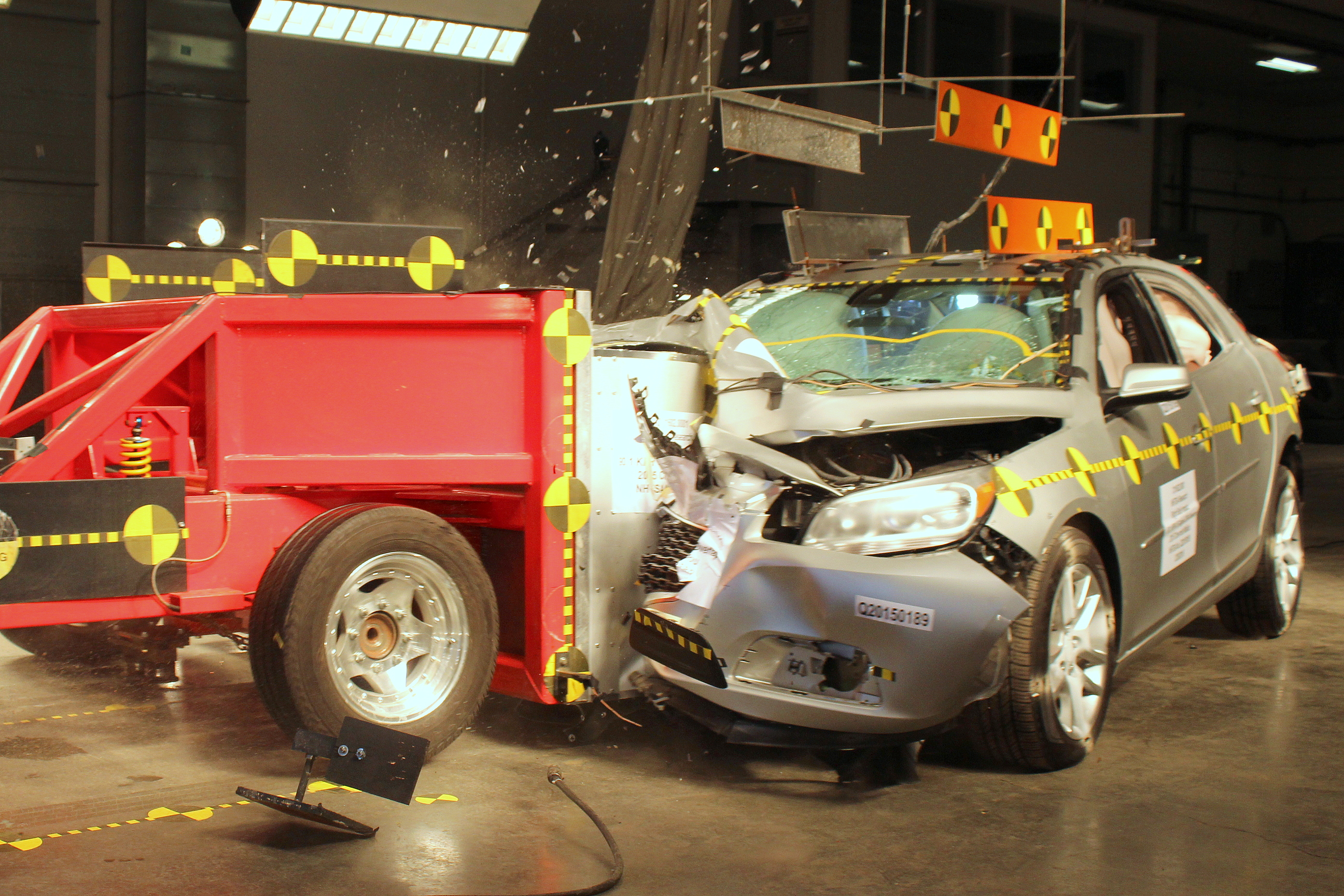
Passenger-side oblique crash test of a 2015 Chevrolet Malibu

== Major providers ==
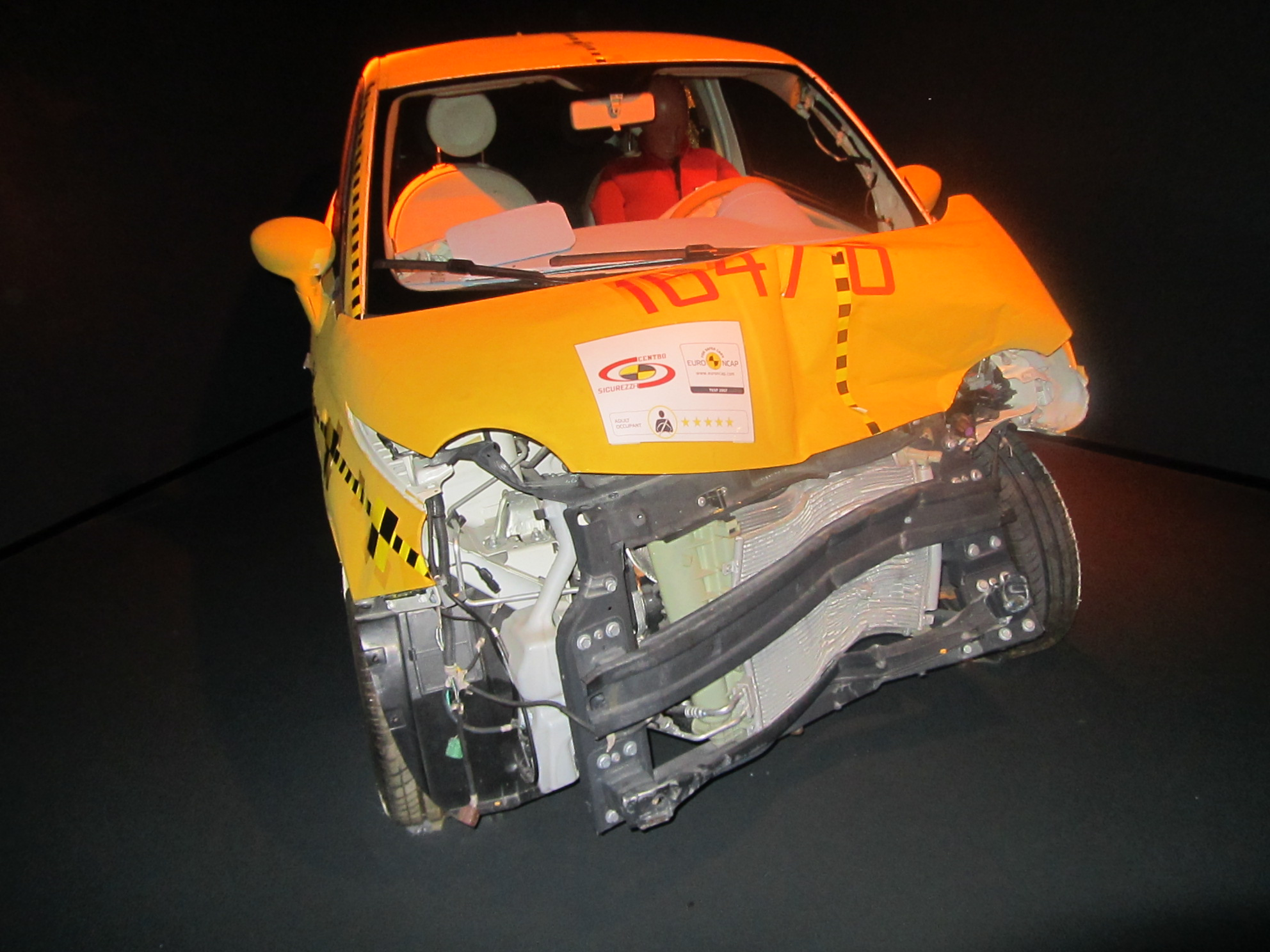
Fiat 500 del 2007 in Euro NCAP crash test (Torino museum)

Name	Abbreviation	Founded	Location
United States New Car Assessment Program	US NCAP (U.S. NCAP)	1978	Washington, DC, United States
Insurance Institute for Highway Safety	IIHS	1959, first crash test 1969, ratings from 1995	Arlington, VA, United States
Australasian New Car Assessment Program	ANCAP	1993	Canberra, Australia
Japan New Car Assessment Programme	JNCAP	1995	Tokyo, Japan
European New Car Assessment Programme	Euro NCAP	1996	Leuven, Belgium
Korean New Car Assessment Program	KNCAP	1999	Hwaseong-si, South Korea
China – New Car Assessment Programme	C-NCAP	2006	Tianjin, China
Latin New Car Assessment Programme	Latin NCAP	2010	Montevideo, Uruguay
New Car Assessment Program for Southeast Asia	ASEAN NCAP	2011	Kajang, Selangor, Malaysia
Global New Car Assessment Programme	Global NCAP	2011	London, UK
Taiwan New Car Assessment Program	TNCAP	2018, ratings from 2023	Changhua, Taiwan
Green NCAP (operated by Euro NCAP for emissions)	Green NCAP	2019	Leuven, Belgium
Bharat New Car Assessment Program	Bharat NCAP	2023	Pune, India

- Auto Review Car Assessment Program (ARCAP)
- Allgemeiner Deutscher Automobil-Club (ADAC) in Germany
- National Highway Traffic Safety Administration (NHTSA) in the United States, specifically the Federal Motor Vehicle Safety Standard (FMVSS) and New Car Assessment Program (NCAP)

== Data collection ==
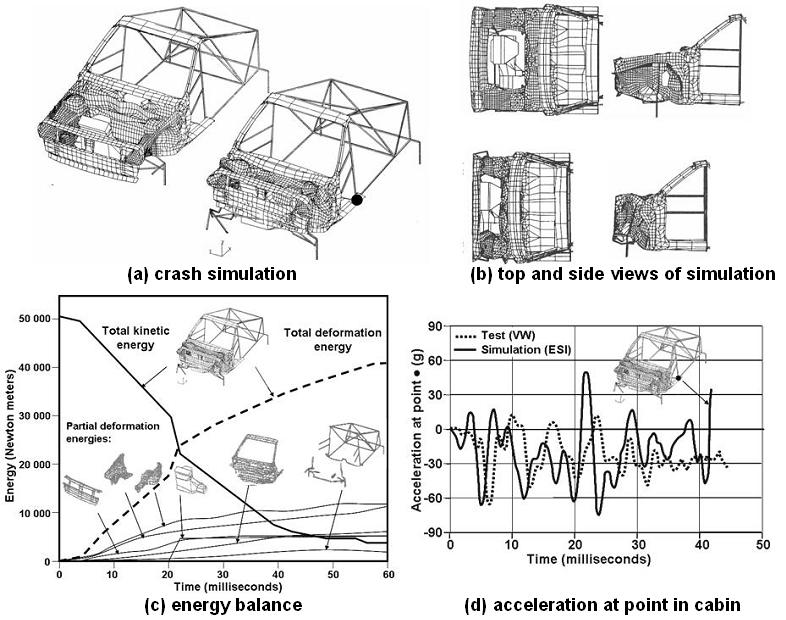
Crash test graphics

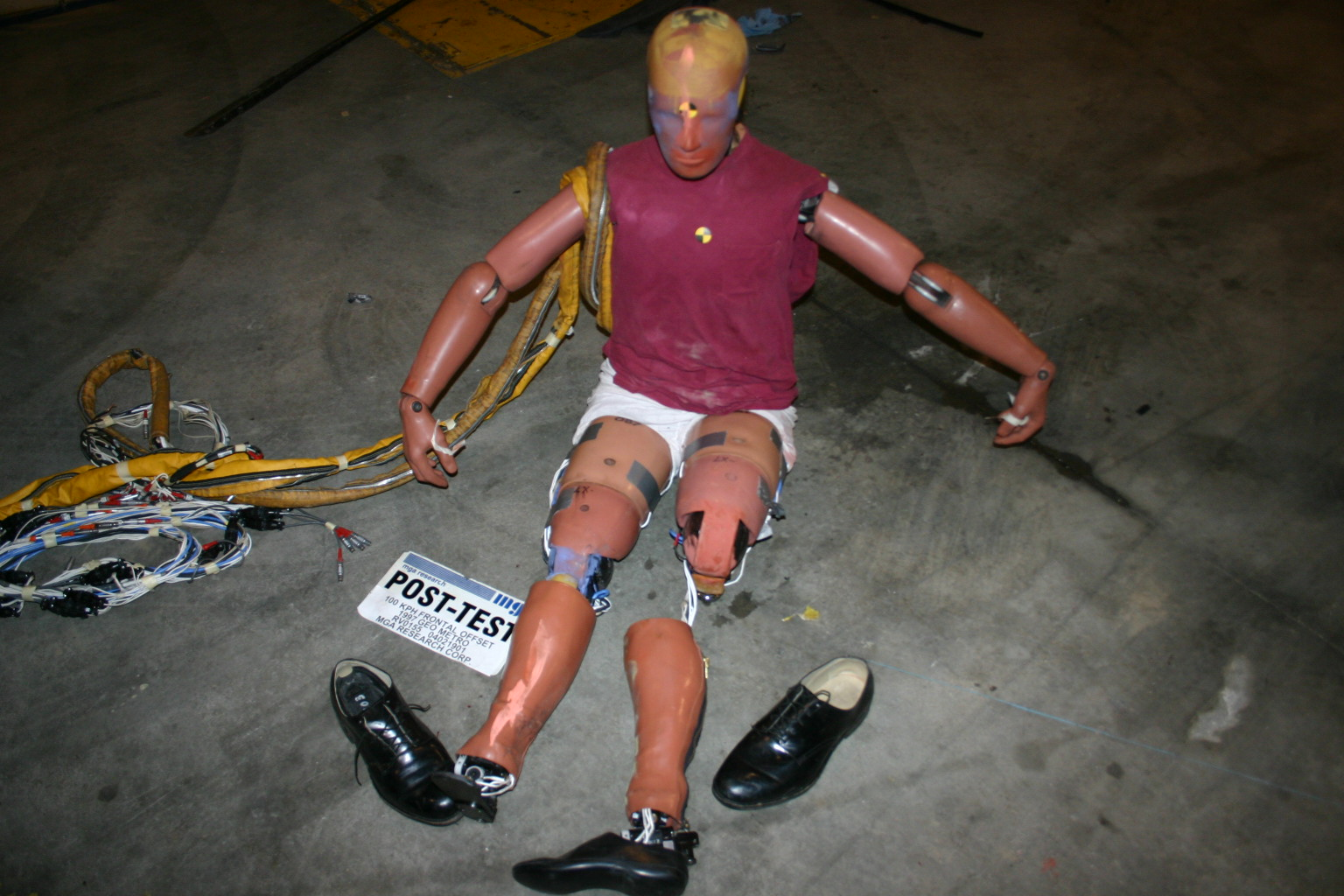
Crash test dummy left paraplegic after a severe oblique crash test inside a 1997 Geo Metro

Crash tests are conducted under rigorous scientific and safety standards. Each crash test is very expensive so the maximum amount of data must be extracted from each test. Usually, this requires the use of high-speed data-acquisition, at least one triaxial accelerometer and a crash test dummy, but often includes more.

Some organizations that conduct crash tests include Calspan, an independent test laboratory in Buffalo, NY. As a result of the capabilities and expertise at Calspan, Calspan has been awarded 5 year contracts by the National Highway Traffic Safety Administration (NHTSA) to execute for the NHTSA FMVSS No. 214, Side Impact Protection Compliance Testing, FMVSS No. 301 Fuel System Integrity, and FMVSS No. 305 Electric Powered Vehicles: Electrolyte Spillage and Electrical Shock Protection vehicle crash tests. Calspan also holds the NHTSA contracts for executing New Car Assessment Program crash tests.

Also, the Monash University department of civil engineering routinely conducts crash tests for the purposes of roadside barrier safety and design.

== Consumer response ==
- In 1998 the Rover 100 received a one-star Adult Occupant Rating in EuroNCAP crash tests; sales promptly collapsed and the 18-year-old design was quickly scrapped.
- In 2005 the Daewoo Kalos made news in Europe and Australia by scoring only two stars in its crash test, resulting in lower sales and demonstrating the influence of vehicle crashworthiness on a model's success in the marketplace. The result for Holden in Australia, who retailed the Kalos under the Holden Barina name, resulted in a considerable amount of negative publicity, with the managing director of Holden forced to publicly defend the vehicle.
- The second generation Isuzu Trooper (1995–1997) models were rated "Not Acceptable" by Consumer Reports for their tendency to roll over during testing. After the report Trooper sales never recovered and two years later production ceased.

== Crash testing programs ==
There are a number of crash test programs around the world dedicated to providing consumers with a source of comparitative information in relation to the safety performance of new and used vehicles. Examples of new car crash test programs include National Highway Traffic Safety Administration's NCAP, the Insurance Institute for Highway Safety, Australasian New Car Assessment Program, EuroNCAP and JapNCAP. Programs such as the Used Car Safety Ratings provide consumers information on the safety performance of vehicles based on real world crash data.

In 2020, EuroNCAP introduces a mobile progressive deformable barrier (MPDB) test first experimented on the Toyota Yaris.

== See also ==
- Air safety
- Automobile safety
- Automobile safety rating
- Car accident
- Crash test dummy
- Crashworthiness
- European New Car Assessment Programme (Euro NCAP)
- Head injury criterion
- Insurance Institute for Highway Safety
- Moose test
- Out of position (crash testing)
- NASA Impact Dynamics Research Facility
