= Side collision =

Vehicle crash where the side of one or more vehicles is impacted

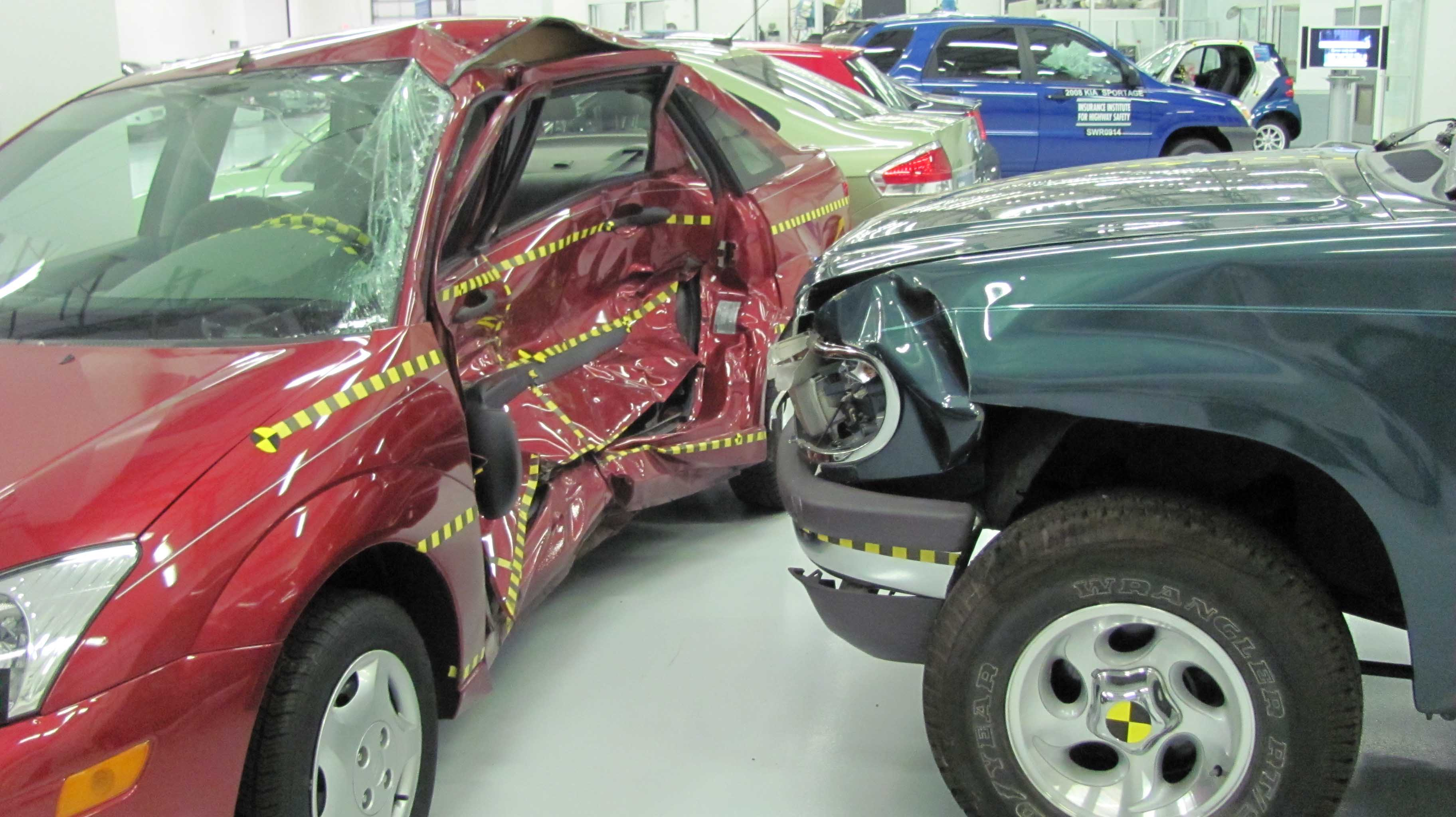
A crash test by the Insurance Institute for Highway Safety shows the damage to a compact Ford Focus struck by a Ford Explorer SUV.

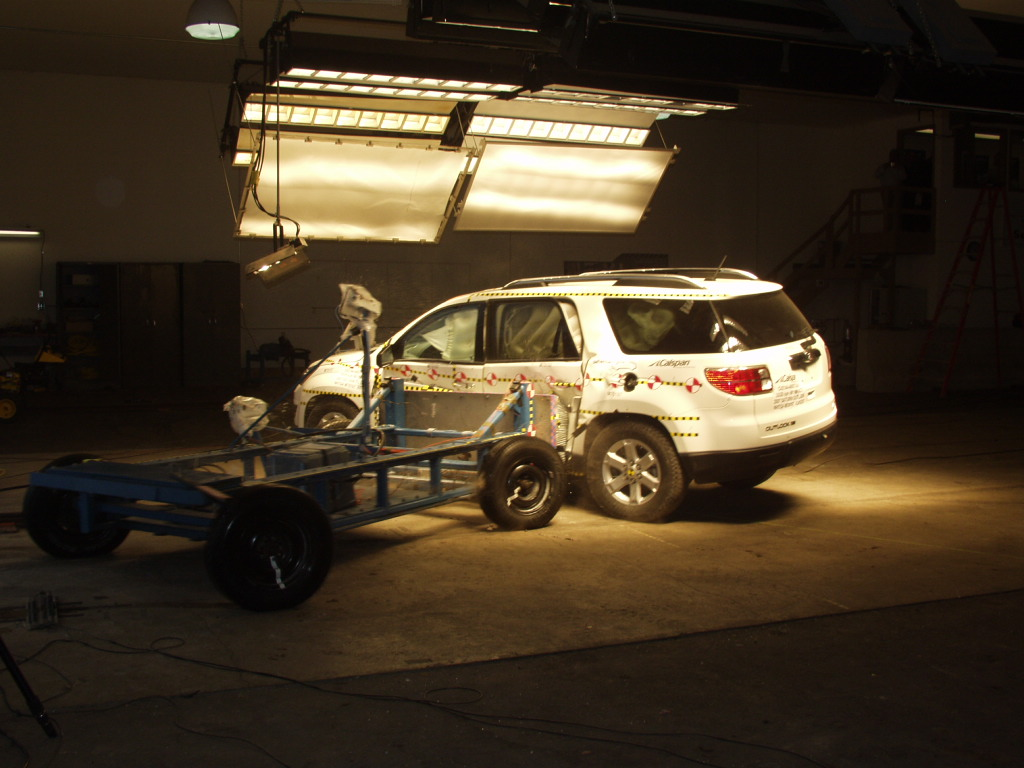
Side impact NCAP test of a 2007 Saturn Outlook

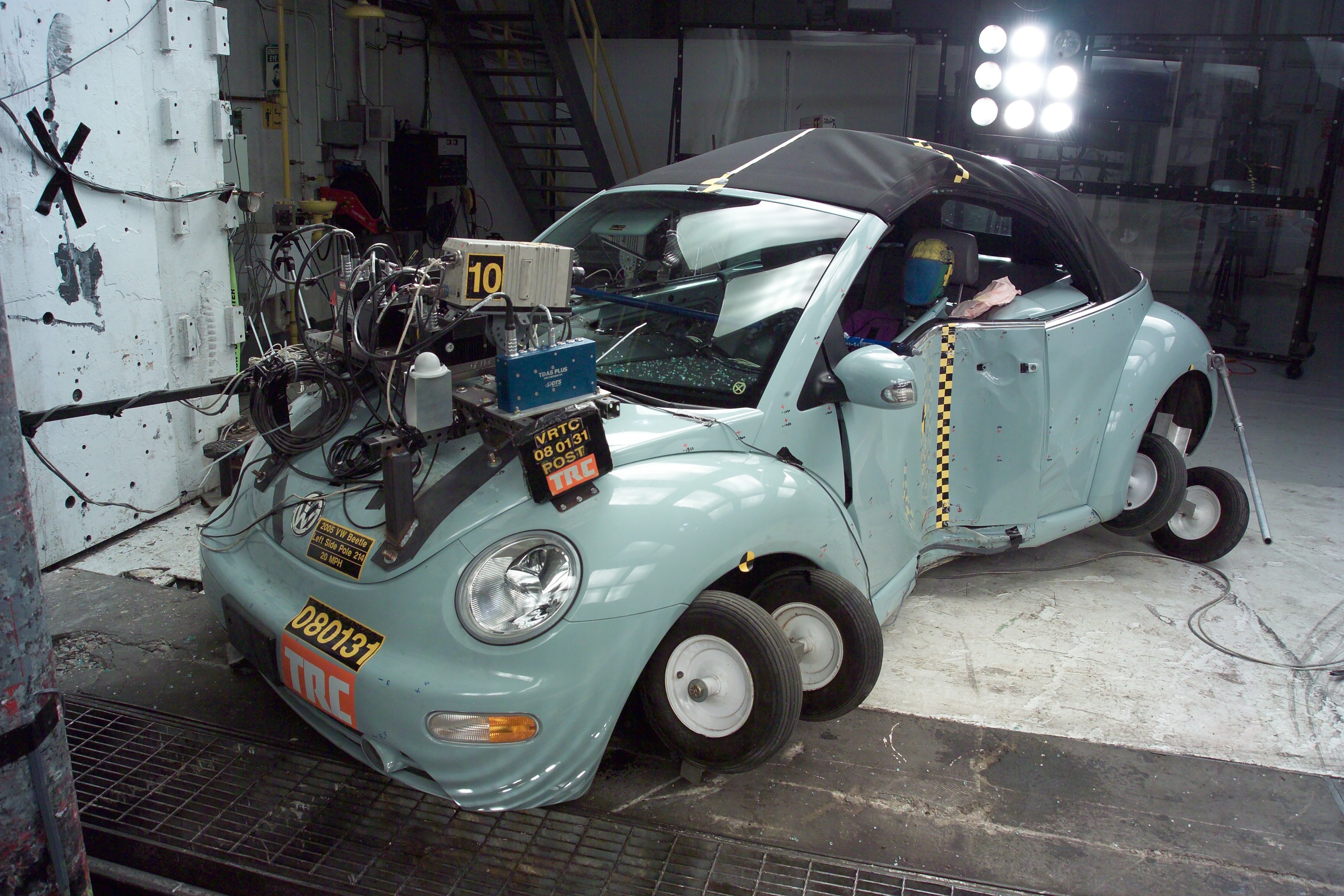
This NHTSA collision test shows what happens when a Volkswagen New Beetle slides sideways into a utility pole or a tree.

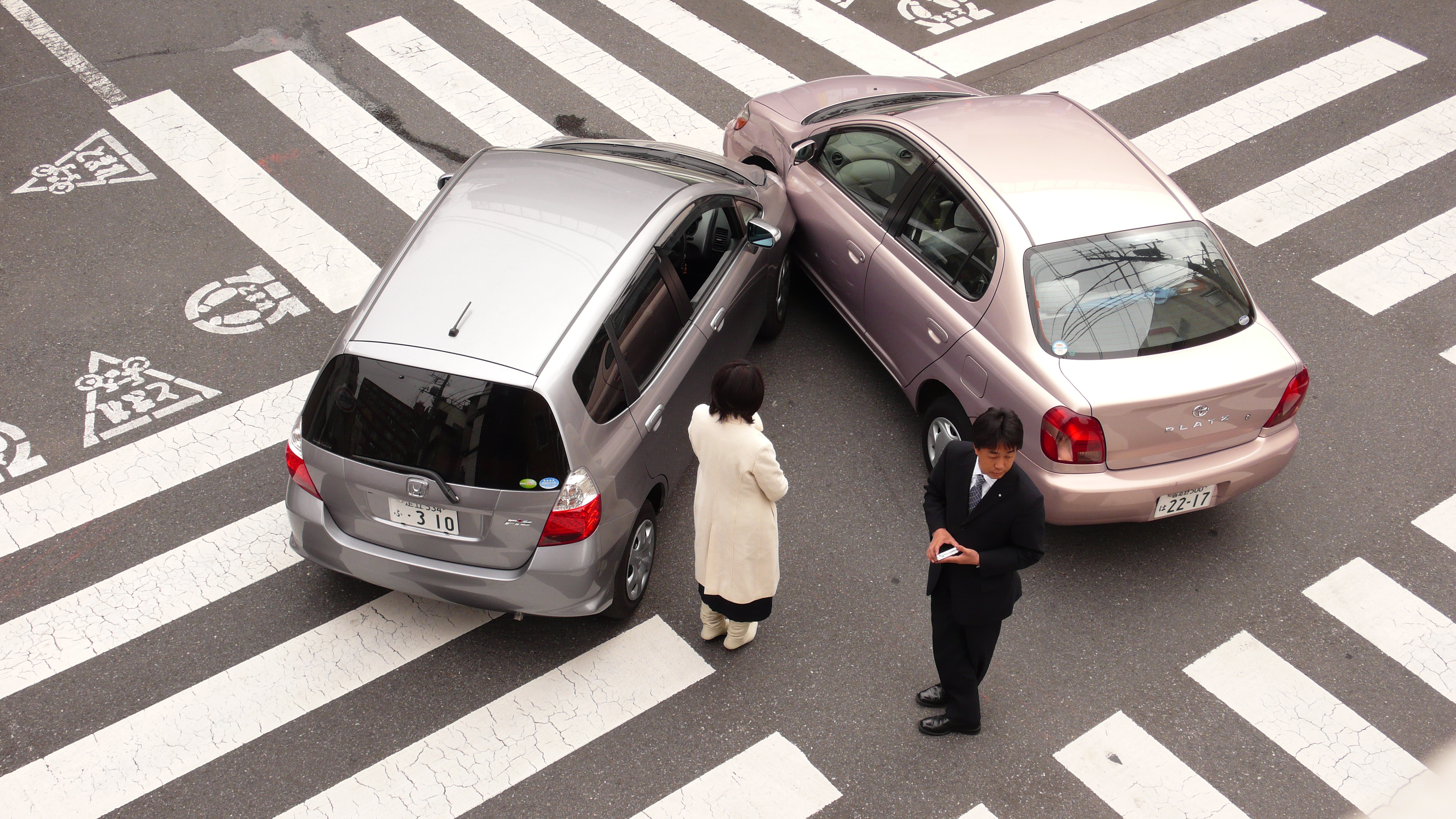
Two cars, a Honda Fit and a Toyota Platz, are involved in a side collision at an intersection in Tokyo, Japan.

A side collision, also called a T-bone accident, is a vehicle crash where the side of one or more vehicles is impacted. These crashes typically occur at intersections, in parking lots, and when two vehicles pass on a multi-lane roadway.

== Occurrences and effects ==
A 2016 study found that, in the EU, side impact collisions were significantly less common than frontal impact collisions, at rates of 22-29% and 61-69% respectively. However, they tend to be much more dangerous. Another report commissioned by the EU in 2015 found that side impacts accounted for roughly 35-40% of passenger fatality and serious injury, as opposed to 55% attributed to head-on collisions. A likely contributor to this fact is the amount of protection offered by the struck vehicle. Even when equipped with the safest cars on the road, these casualties occurred at much lower speeds than in head-on collisions, with passenger fatality and serious injury typically occurring at 50 km/h (~31 mph) in side impact collisions, as opposed to 70 km/h (~43 mph) for frontal impacts. Additionally, side impacts tend to affect more vulnerable areas of the body. While front and rear impacts typically produced the most serious injuries in the lower extremities (legs and feet), side impacts typically resulted in most serious injuries in the head and chest regions.

In 2008, a total of 5,265 (22%) out of 23,888 people were killed in vehicles which were struck in the side in the United States.

For European motorcyclists, side impact is the second most frequent location of impact.

For European cyclists, thorax injuries are associated with side-impact injuries in urban areas and/or at junctions.

In several European countries, such as the UK, Sweden, and France, around one quarter of traffic injuries are produced by side collisions, but accounted for 29 to 38% of injuries which were fatal.

In European vehicle side impact, 60% of casualties were "struck side", while 40% were "non struck side", in 2018.

Fatal casualties count as 50% and 67% in UK and in France, in 2010

Also, side collision are not well managed with child restraints which are not enough taking into account the movement of the child's head and prevent contact with the car's interior.

For light vans and minibuses in 2000 in UK and Germany, between 14% and 26% of accidents with passenger cars were side impacts.

In Shanghai, in China, 23% of the 1097 serious accidents occurred between June 2005 and March 2013 are side impact accidents, there the leading collision mode, according to the Shanghai United Road Traffic Safety Scientific Research Center (SHUFO) database. The head and neck are involved in around 64% of the casualties.

== Testing ==
Euro NCAP, IIHS and NHTSA test side impacts in different ways. As of 2015, they all test vehicle-to-vehicle side impacts, where heavier vehicles have lower fatality rates than lighter vehicles.

NHTSA and Euro NCAP also test the more severe vehicle-into-pole side impacts, where smaller vehicles have the same fatality rate as larger vehicles.

Newer cars have improved safety in case of front crashes, but side impacts can also be deadly; about 9,700 people were killed in side impacts in the US in 2004. Side airbags became mandatory in 2009 in the US, saving an estimated 1,000 lives per year. Research indicates that the vehicle's underbody is the best place to reinforce structures to reduce intrusion by the pole.

== General list of side impacts ==
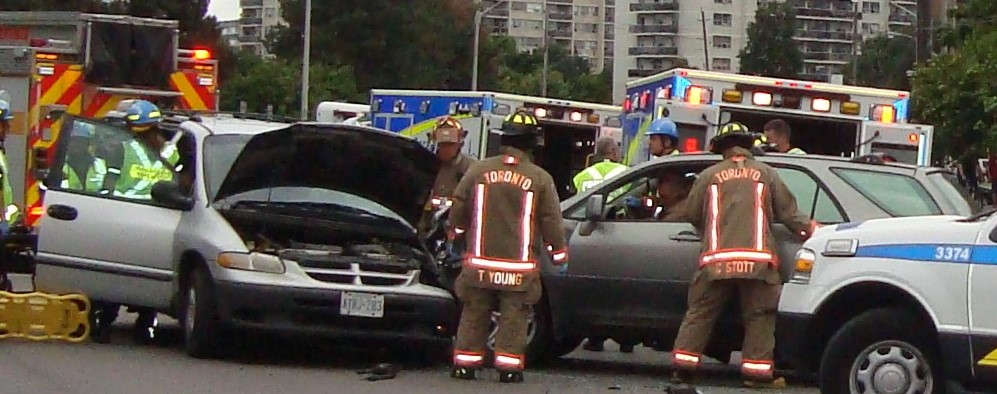
A side collision in Toronto

These are lists of cars with notable aspects of side impact.

=== List of cars after 2011 ===
The NHTSA results are evaluated by the National Highway Traffic Safety Administration using Office of Crashworthiness Standards, New Car Assessment Program (NCAP) Side Impact Laboratory Test Procedure and Side Impact Rigid Pole Laboratory Test Procedure to display a simple star-rating. The "primary purpose of the NCAP side impact program is to provide comparative vehicle side protection information to assist consumers in making vehicle purchase decisions, thereby providing an incentive for vehicle manufacturers to design safer vehicles."

The IIHS results are evaluated by Insurance Institute for Highway Safety using their protocols.

This list shows the most notable of newer tested vehicles tested via NHTSA and IIHS. Some provide good protection, some less so, and some developed improved safety in response to a low result (Dodge Ram and Fiat 500). Some are common examples of their type.

Sorted roughly by rating, Head injury criterion (HIC) and Crush.

Side impact safety of newer cars (from 2011–present), by NHTSA and IIHS. Click <> to sort by parameter.
| Year (Note: Model Year of car crash-tested, not year of Overall Rating. Older crash tests usually carry over to newer car models; easily checked by comparing ratings and document numbers for different years.) | Manufacturer | Model | Type | Number produced (Note: Number of cars produced of this model.) | Impactor (MDB) into Vehicle (Note: Also known as Moving Deformable Barrier.) | | | Vehicle into pole | | | | Comment | IIHS side rating | Euro NCAP side rating |
| Year | Manufacturer | Model | Type | Number produced | Maximum Crush (Note: Free space left after impact.) | HIC (Note: Head Injury Criteria (HIC36) has a threshold of 1000; lower is better. MDB HIC shows front+rear seat of impact side.) | Rating (Note: Side Barrier Rating, combines front and rear seats.) | Maximum Crush | HIC | RLSA (Note: RLSA=Resultant Lower Spine Acceleration, measured in g-force. Detract rating over 50g. Threshold is 82g.) | Rating | Comment | IIHS side rating | Euro NCAP side rating |
|---|---|---|---|---|---|---|---|---|---|---|---|---|---|---|
| 2014 | | Jeep Wrangler | SUV | 1 million | mm | | —N/a | mm | | g | —N/a | | Poor | —N/a |
| 2012 | Chrysler | 200 | Mid | | 202 mm | | 5/5 stars | 392 mm | 1987 | 51 g | 1/5 stars | Head injury criterion above threshold. | Good | —N/a |
| 2015 | Toyota | Hilux/Tacoma | Truck | 5+ million | 305 mm | 125+292 | 4/5 stars | 516 mm | 451 | 57 g | 3/5 stars | | | |
| 2013 | Fiat | 500 | Supermini | 1+ million | 164 mm | 166+382 | 5/5 stars | 354 mm | 224 | 54 g | 3/5 stars | MDB: Pelvic force and pax RLSA within threshold. | Good | —N/a |
| 2012 | Fiat | 500 | Supermini | | 160 mm | 127+410 | 3/5 stars | 354 mm | 224 | 54 g | 3/5 stars | MDB: Pax pelvic force over threshold, and RLSA near. | | |
| 2013 | Dodge | Ram 1500 | Truck | | 365 mm | 16+30 | 5/5 stars | 603 mm | 483 | 48 g | 5/5 stars | All parameters within limits. | —N/a | —N/a |
| 2011 | Dodge | Ram 1500 | Truck | | mm | | 5/5 stars | 462 mm | 519 | 87 g | 1/5 stars | Pole Test: Pelvic force and RLSA over threshold. | | |
| 2014 | Mercedes-Benz | E-Class | Sedan | | 129 mm | 92+244 | 5/5 stars | 343 mm | 492 | 53 g | 3/5 stars | Pole Test: Pelvic force 4770 N of a threshold of 5525 N | | |
| 2012 | Chrysler | Town & Country | Minivan | | 298 mm | 51+135 | 5/5 stars | 389 mm | 294 | 47 g | 5/5 stars | Pole Test: Pelvic force 3503 N of a threshold of 5525 N | Good | —N/a |
| 2014 | Audi | Q5 | CUV | | 188 mm | 59+166 | 5/5 stars | 467 mm | 253 | 54 g | 5/5 stars | | | |
| 2011 | Volvo | XC60 | CUV | ½ million | 170 mm | 60+231 | 5/5 stars | 462 mm | 242 | 45 g | 5/5 stars | | | |

Limits are:
Moving Deformable Barrier (MDB): HIC max. 1000, Chest injury max. 44mm, abdominal injury max. 2500 Newton, pelvis injury max. 6000 N. There are additional limits for passenger similar to pole test.
Rigid Pole: HIC max. 1000, Lower Spine acceleration max. 82g, Pelvis sum max. 5525 N

=== List of cars before 2011 ===
Sorted roughly by rating.

Side impact safety of older cars (before 2011) by NHTSA, IIHS and Euro NCAP. Click <> to sort by parameter.
| Year (Note: Model Year of car crash-tested, not year of Overall Rating. Older crash tests usually carry over to newer car models; easily checked by comparing ratings and document numbers for different years.) | Manufacturer | Model | Type | Number produced (Note: Number of cars produced of this model.) | NHTSA rating | IIHS side rating | Euro NCAP side rating | Comment |
|---|---|---|---|---|---|---|---|---|
| 2003-2006 | Ford | Crown Victoria | Full-size | | 4.5/5 stars | Poor | —N/a | Structure rated "Poor" |
| 2008-2015 | | Jeep Wrangler | SUV | 1 million | —N/a | Poor | —N/a | Structure rated "Acceptable" |
| 2004 | Mitsubishi | Galant | Sedan | | 4.5/5 stars | Poor | | 2005 with airbag is Good at IIHS |
| Year | Manufacturer | Model | Type | Produced | 4.5/5 stars | Good | 5/5 stars | —N/a |

== See also ==
- Road collision types
- Side Impact Protection System (SIPS)
