= Insurance Institute for Highway Safety =

U.S. nonprofit organization

- Insurance Institute for Highway Safety and Highway Loss Data Institute
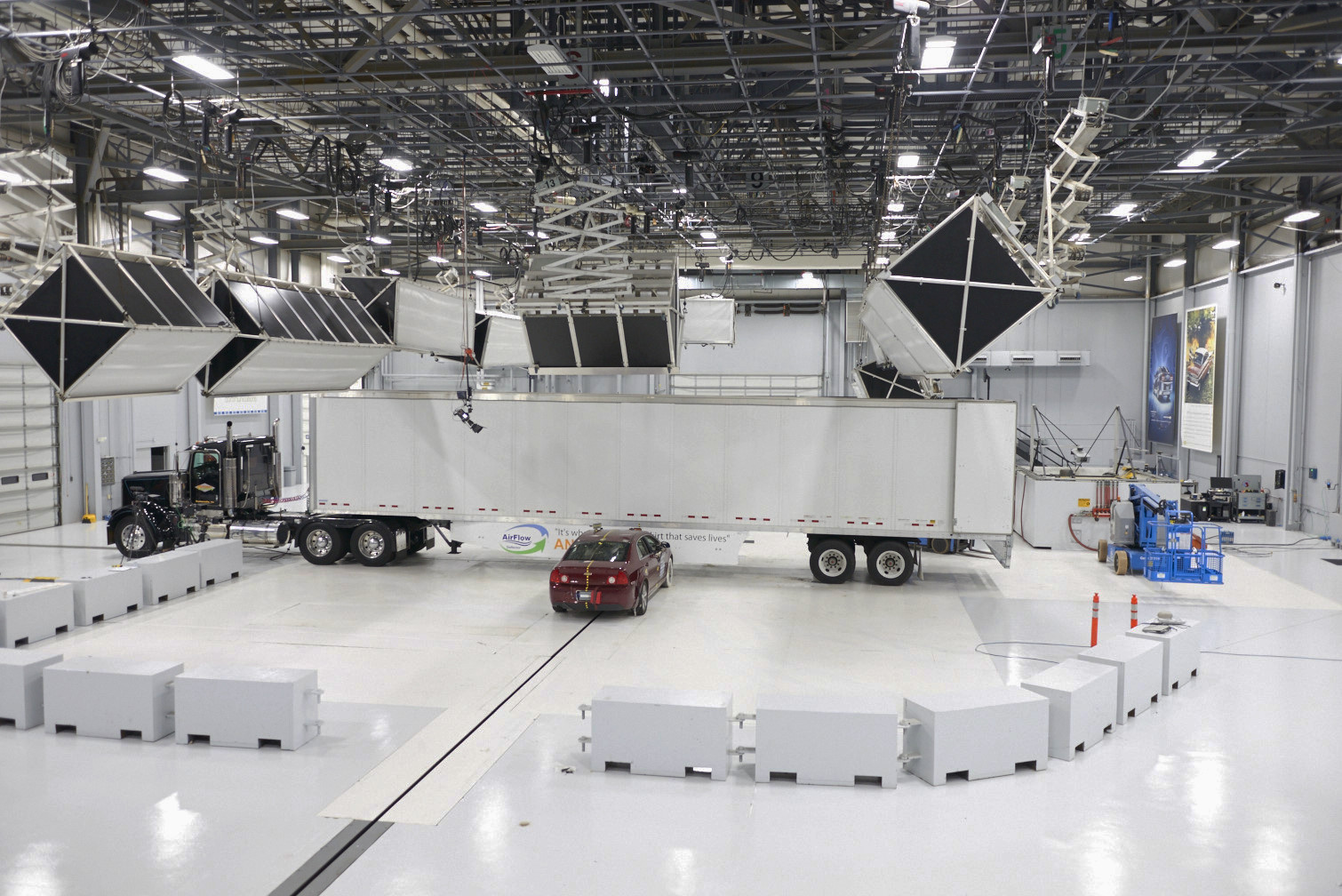
- Interior of the IIHS' Vehicle Research Crash Hall
- Abbreviation: IIHS-HLDI
- Formation: 1959; 67 years ago (IIHS)
- Type: 501(c)(3)
- Tax ID no.: 53-0246204 (IIHS)
- Legal status: Non-profit organization
- Headquarters: Arlington, Virginia, U.S.
- Coordinates: 38.8802646°N 77.1126997°W
- President, IIHS: David Harkey
- Chair, IIHS: Ginger Purgatorio
- Revenue: $34,396,378 (IIHS) (2024)
- Expenses: $34,430,737 (IIHS) (2024)
- Endowment: $2,554,385 (2024)
- Staff: 101 (IIHS) (2024)
- Volunteers: 28 (IIHS) (2024)
- Website: www.iihs.org

The Insurance Institute for Highway Safety and Highway Loss Data Institute (IIHS-HLDI) is an American nonprofit organization. It was established in 1959, and it is noted for its safety reviews of vehicles in various crash tests, including the effectiveness of a vehicle's structural integrity and safety systems during a collision, in addition to examining improvement on such elements.

IIHS releases an annual list of the safest vehicles, which includes list of "Top Safety Picks" as well as a "Top Safety Picks+".

== History ==
The IIHS was founded in 1959 by three separate insurance groups—the Association of Casualty and Surety Companies, the National Association of Automotive Mutual Insurance Companies, and the National Association of Independent Insurers—as a supporting entity to other academic and research organizations involving highway safety. Russell Brown served as the inaugural president of the IIHS until 1968, when its board of governors changed the IIHS to an independent scientific organization. The following year, Physician William Haddon Jr. assumed the position of IIHS president after the change, and the IIHS began conducting crash tests starting with the low-speed bumper test.

In 1972, the Highway Loss Data Institute (HLDI) was founded as a supporting organization to the IIHS, as was the latter's original purpose for other organizations. The HLDI compiles and publishes insurance loss statistics due to incidents such as traffic collisions and consequential damages depending on the vehicle type.

The IIHS and HLDI are interchangeably referred to as one entity (IIHS-HLDI) or separate entities by the organization itself.

== Funding ==
IIHS and HLDI are funded by their members, which are insurance companies and groups of insurance companies.

== Frontal crash tests ==
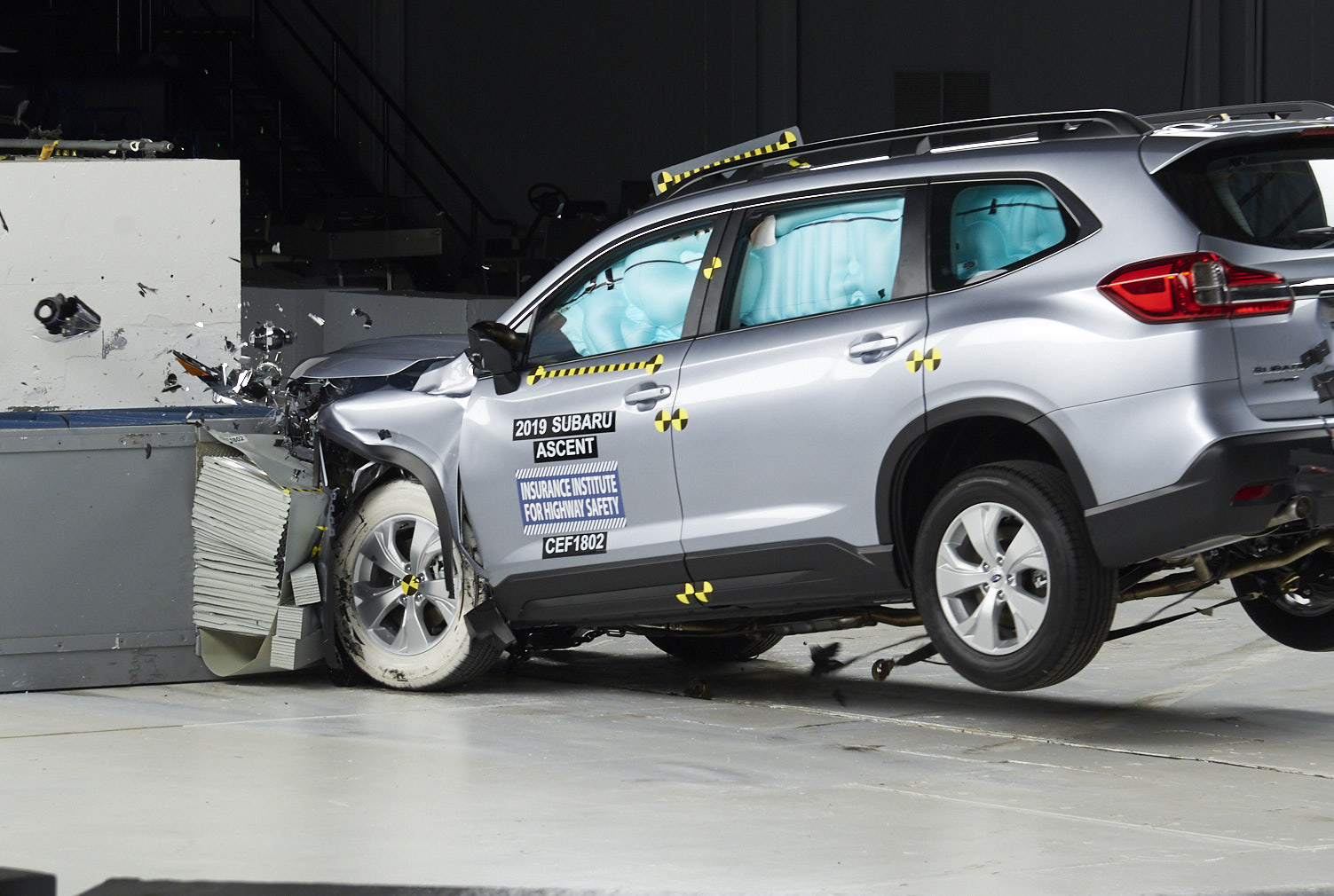
Frontal moderate overlap crash test of a 2019 Subaru Ascent

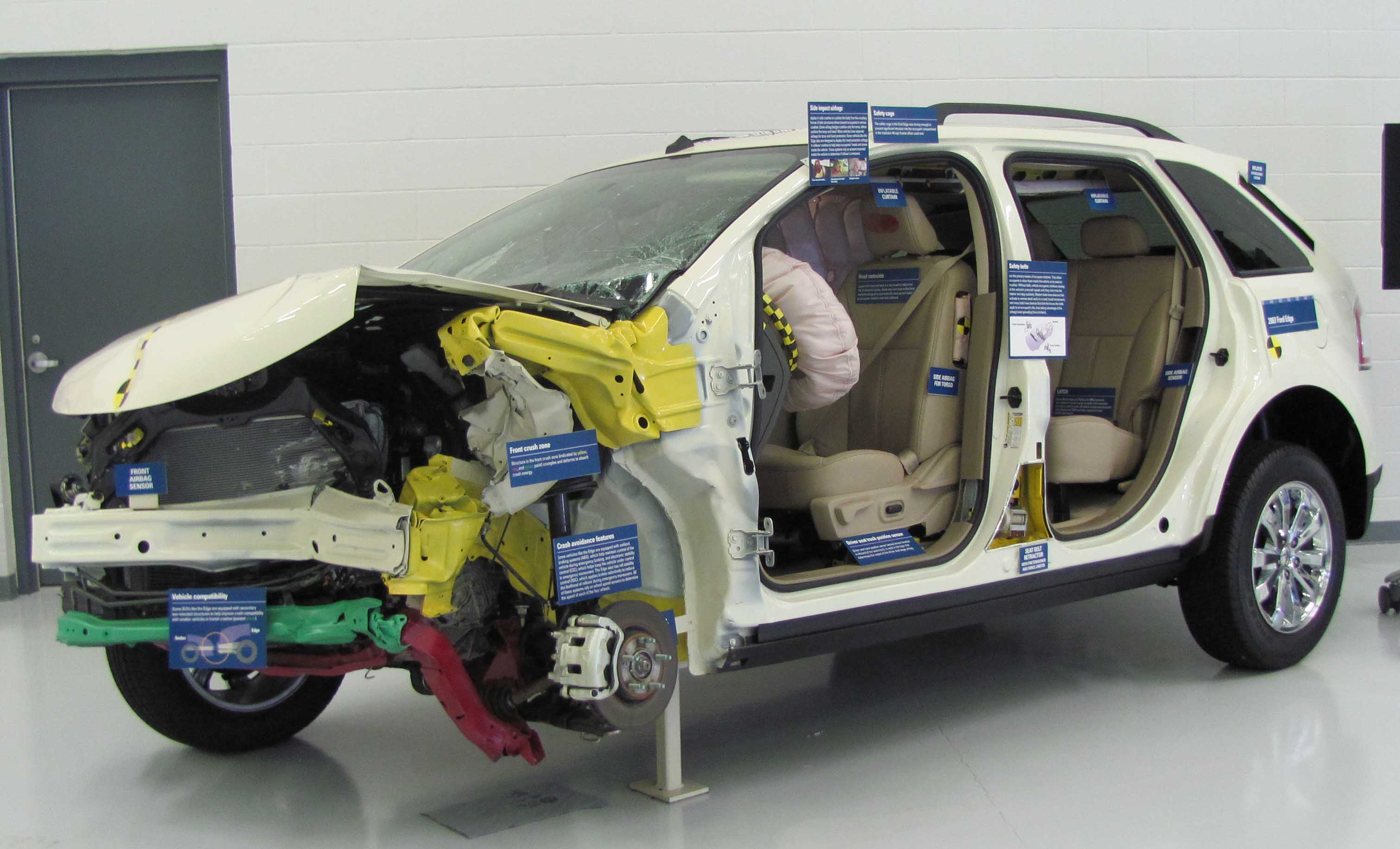
The 2007 Ford Edge passed this test with the institute's highest rating, "Good". The tested Edge is displayed at the institute's headquarters as an example of a standout performer in a frontal offset crash.

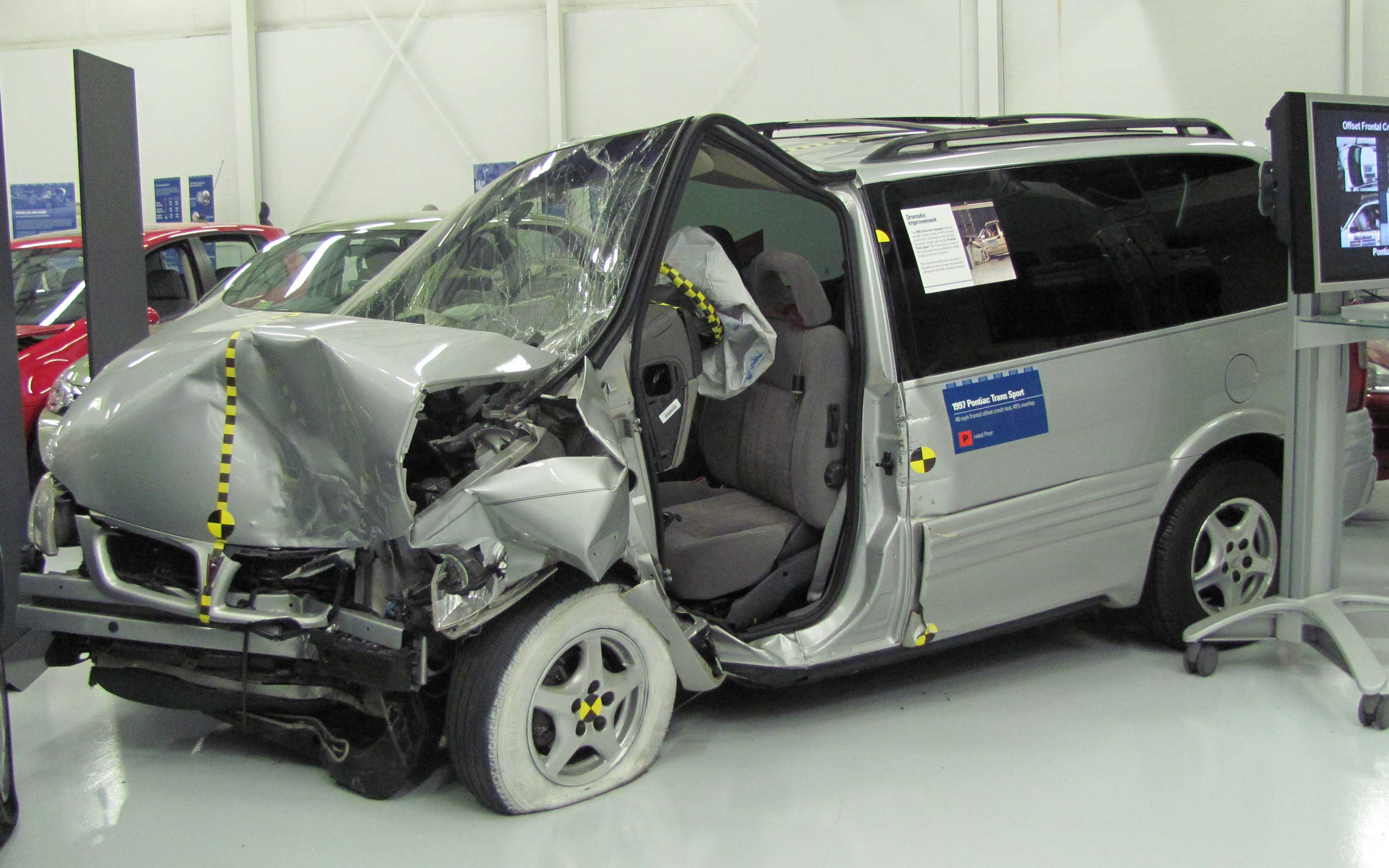
The 1997 Pontiac Trans Sport had significantly worse performance in frontal offset crash test according to then-institute head Brian O'Neill compared to other contemporary minivans. One of the tested Trans Sports is displayed at the institute's headquarters.

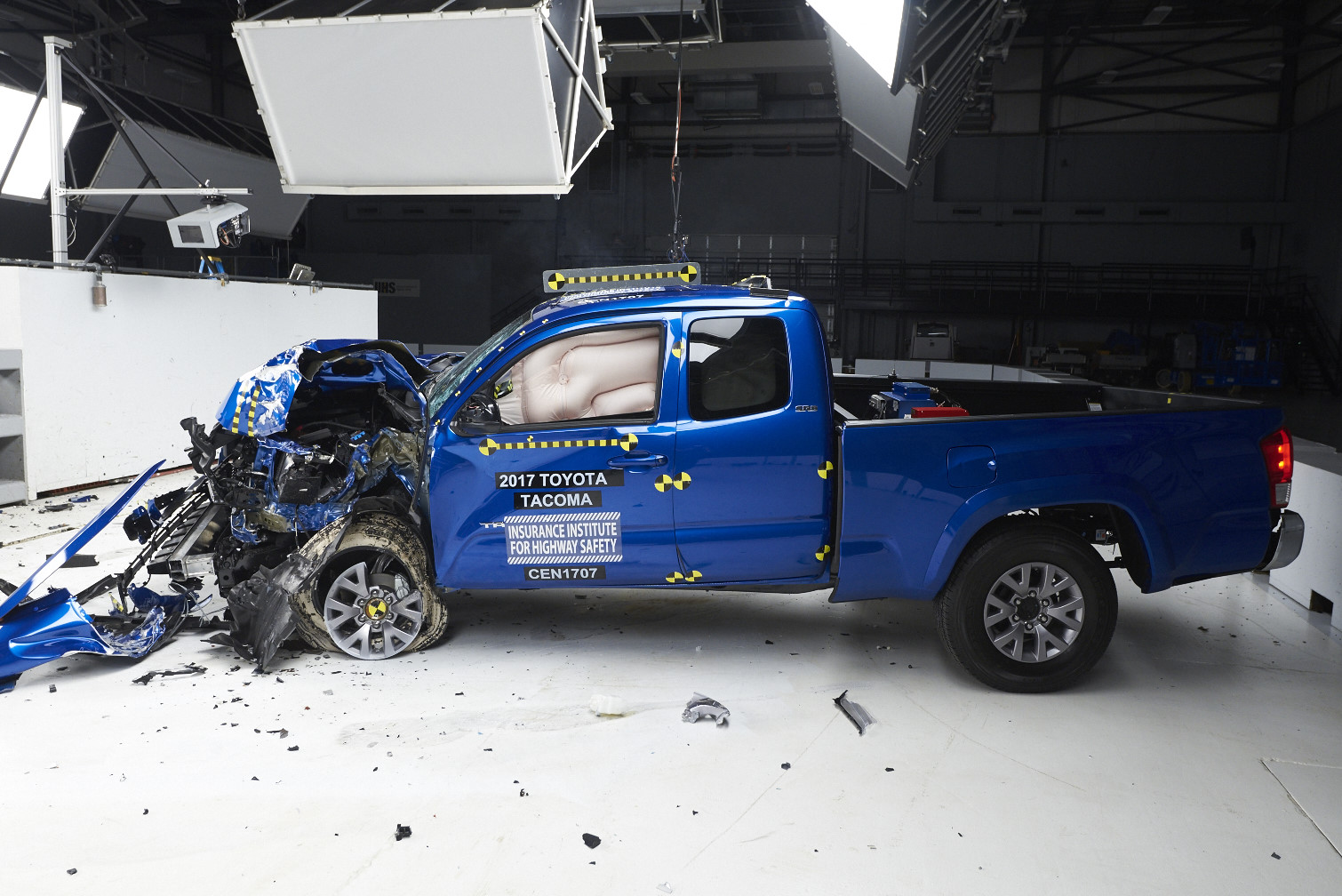
The 2017 Toyota Tacoma is one of many vehicles that passed the institute's challenging small overlap test.

The IIHS evaluates six individual categories, assigning each a "Good", "Acceptable", "Marginal", or "Poor" rating before determining the vehicle's overall frontal impact rating.

=== Moderate overlap frontal test ===
The moderate overlap test (formerly frontal offset test), introduced in January 1995, differs from that of the U.S. government's National Highway Traffic Safety Administration (NHTSA) New Car Assessment Program (NCAP) in that its tests are offset. The NHTSA standards require vehicles to provide no injuries to occupants after a head-on impact into a fixed barrier at 30 mph (48 km/h), not at an angle. The IIHS test exposes 40% of the front of the vehicle to an impact with a deformable barrier at approximately 40 mph (64 km/h). This offset test represents approximately 0.04% of all car crashes and "is the equivalent of running a vehicle into a parked car at 75 mph (121 km/h).

As with the NHTSA's frontal impact test, vehicles across different weight categories may not be directly compared. This is because the heavier vehicle is generally considered to have an advantage if it encounters a lighter vehicle or is involved in a single-vehicle crash. The IIHS demonstrated this by crashing three midsize sedans with three smaller "Good" rated minicars. The three minicars were rated "Poor" in these special offset head-on car-to-car tests in 2009, while the midsize cars rated "Good" or "Acceptable".

In December 2022 the IIHS updated the moderate overlap test to include a second crash test dummy seated behind the driver. The IIHS said that the advanced seat belt protections found in the front passenger seats, including crash tensioners and load limiters, should also exist in the rear passenger seats. Out of 15 small SUVs subjected to the new test, nine received an overall rating of poor due to high rear passenger injury measurements to the head, neck and chest.

=== Small overlap frontal test ===
On August 14, 2012, IIHS released the first results for a new test, called the "small overlap front test." The new test, which is used in addition to the 40% offset test introduced in 1995, subjects only 25% of the front end of the vehicle to a 40 mph impact against a solid, rounded-off barrier. As a result, it is far more demanding on the vehicle structure than the 40% offset test. In the first round of tests, composed of 11 midsized luxury and near-luxury vehicles, most vehicles did poorly; only three vehicles received "good" or "acceptable" ratings.

The rating system is similar to the 40% offset, but has some key differences: hip/thigh and lower leg/foot ratings replace individual ratings for each leg and foot, and a full score cannot be attained without deployment of front and side curtain airbags (due to the severe side movement often resulting from this test).

A Medical College of Wisconsin study found small-overlap collisions result in increased head, chest, spine, hip, and pelvis injuries. This sort of collision is common on two-lane roads with two-way traffic where a center median is absent. Single vehicle crashes (into a tree or a pole) account for 40% of small-overlap crashes. According to the IIHS, 25% of frontal crash deaths are due to small overlap crashes, with the outer front wheel first to receive the impact forces rather than the more central crash absorbing structure.

The IIHS has since tested family cars, compact cars, minicars, small and midsized SUVs, minivans, muscle cars and large pickup trucks through the small-overlap test.

In 2015, the IIHS began conducting this test on the passenger side of vehicles.

== Side impact test ==
The IIHS introduced the side impact test in 2003. In this test, the test vehicle remains stationary while a four-wheeled sled, with a deformable barrier attached, strikes the side of the vehicle at 31 mph (50 km/h). This test is used to simulate the impact of a high-riding pickup or SUV on the subject vehicle.

In 2019, the IIHS modified the test by using a heavier sled, changing the barrier design, and increasing the impact speed from 31 to 37 mph (60 km/h). The IIHS cited the original test being unrealistic as the main reason for the modification. This modified side test officially began in 2021. Out of 20 small SUVs tested in the new, tougher side impact tests, only one received a Good rating. In May 2022, the IIHS officially completed its test for the tougher, side crash test on 18 midsize SUVs. Ten midsize SUVs earned good ratings, two more with Acceptable ratings, and six with marginal overall ratings.

== Roof strength test ==
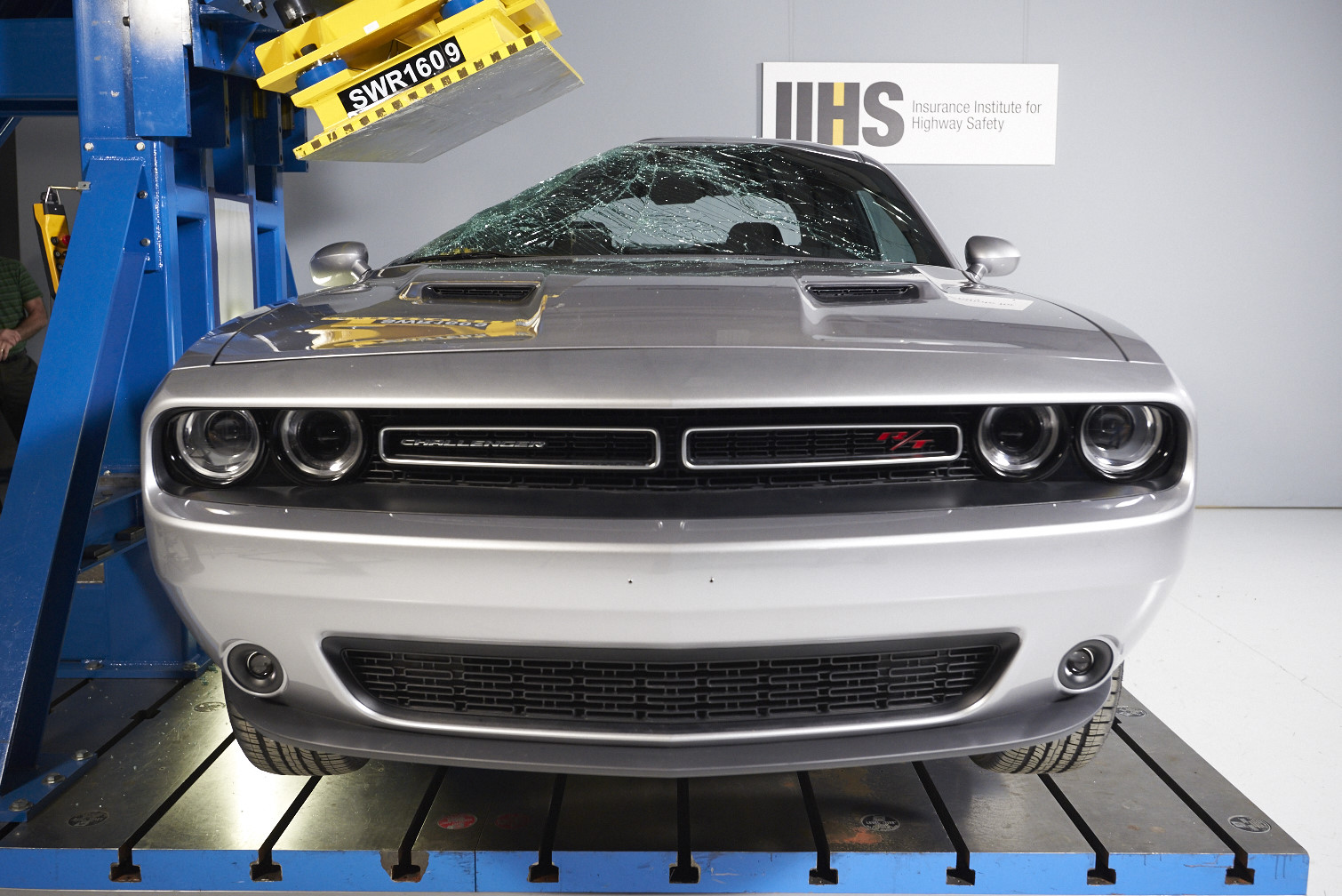
Roof-strength test of a 2016 Dodge Challenger

In the United States, rollovers accounted for nearly 25% of passenger vehicle fatalities. Features such as electronic stability control are proven to significantly reduce rollovers and lane departure warning systems may also help. Rollover sensing side curtain airbags also help to minimize injuries in the event of a rollover.

In the test, which was introduced in 2009, the vehicle rested on a platform while a hydraulic metal plate diagonally pushed on the roof area above the side windows. In order to get the highest rating, the vehicle was to withstand a force equivalent to at least four times its curb weight before collapsing 5 in (130 mm).

The roof strength test was discontinued in 2022.

== 50th Anniversary crash test ==
In 2009, the IIHS celebrated its 50 year anniversary. To illustrate how much automotive safety has progressed in five decades, IIHS tested a 1959 Chevrolet Bel Air crashing head-on, 40% offset with a 2009 Chevrolet Malibu at 40 mph. It put the video of the crash on the Internet and "the results were no surprise to anyone with a passing familiarity with cars." The Bel Air's occupant compartment was extensively damaged by the crash. Coupled with the car's lack of modern safety features such as airbags and seat belts, this resulted in the crash test dummy in the Bel Air recording forces that would have probably caused fatal injuries to a real driver. They "would not only hit the inside of the car and experience a large (and damaging acceleration) but the car would smash you on the inside." Sophisticated engineering and high-strength steel give modern vehicles a huge advantage.

== Head restraint evaluation ==
This tested the vehicle's driver seat to determine effectiveness of the head restraints. The driver's seat was placed on a sled to mimic rear-end collisions at 20 mph. Rear-end collisions at low to moderate speeds typically do not result in serious injuries but they are common. In 2005, the IIHS estimated 25% of medical costs were related to whiplash injuries.

The head restraint evaluation test was discontinued in 2022.

The head restraint test was reintroduced and updated in the 27th of January, 2026 to provide a much more severe crash circumstance. The new test included the original 20mph crash test alongside a 30mph crash test. The metrics used to rate vehicles were updated.

== Frontal collision avoidance evaluation ==
=== Original vehicle-to-vehicle ===
In this test, an engineer drove the test car toward a rolling, cushioned box, which was used to simulate an actual car. The ratings, "basic", "advanced", and "superior", were awarded depending on whether the front crash prevention system met government criteria, and if the system could reduce the speed or avoid the collision at both 12 and 25 mph (19 and 40 km/h).

The original vehicle-to-vehicle test was discontinued in 2022.

=== Vehicle-to-vehicle ===
An engineer drives the test car at speeds of 31, 37, and 43 mph (50, 60, and 69 km/h) toward a target (a semitrailer or an impactable car or motorcycle) that is placed at the center (all three targets) or offset to the left or right (car and motorcycle only). Points are awarded based on how soon the vehicle issues a warning for an impending collision (all three targets) and how much the vehicle slows down to avoid or mitigate the collision (car and motorcycle only). For the semitrailer test, the engineer steers the vehicle away from the semitrailer to avoid a potential crash.

=== Vehicle-to-pedestrian ===
The IIHS runs this test in three different scenarios, each scenario having two different speeds for the tested vehicle.

- 1st scenario: A 6 ft (180 cm) tall adult pedestrian walks perpendicular to oncoming traffic, and the tested vehicle must successfully autobrake enough to avoid hitting the pedestrian at 12 and 25 mph (19 and 40 km/h).
- 2nd scenario: A 45 in (110 cm) tall child (average height of a 7-year-old child) darts out from behind two parked vehicles (the one closer to the child is a sedan, and the farther is an SUV), and the tested vehicle must successfully autobrake enough to avoid hitting the child at 12 and 25 mph (19 and 40 km/h).
- 3rd scenario: A 6 ft (180 cm) tall adult pedestrian walks parallel to traffic, and the tested vehicle must successfully autobrake enough to avoid hitting the pedestrian at 25 and 37 mph (40 and 60 km/h).

== Headlight evaluation ==
In March 2016, the IIHS released ratings for headlight performance. Their first test involved family cars, and most earned marginal or poor ratings. Only one vehicle, the Toyota Prius V, earned a good rating when equipped with specific headlights. The Institute evaluated headlights for small SUVs 4 months later, and none of the vehicles tested earn a good rating. In October 2016, they released ratings for pickup trucks, and the Honda Ridgeline was the only pickup to earn a good rating on the headlights test when equipped with specific headlights.

== Awards ==
The Top Safety Pick (TSP) is an annual award to the best-performing cars of the year. As of the revisions to the award requirements in February 2023, a vehicle must receive overall marks of "Good" in the moderate overlap front, driver-side small overlap front and passenger-side small overlap front tests, as well as the side test that was updated in 2021. Additionally, the headlight rating criteria across all trims of a vehicle must either be "Good" or "Acceptable." Ratings for roof strength, head restraints and vehicle-to-vehicle front crash prevention were previously part of the overall TSP evaluation, but were removed in 2023 as nearly all vehicles tested performed well in these categories. The Top Safety Pick+ award (TSP+) is given to vehicles that meet all the criteria for a Top Safety Pick and perform well in the nighttime vehicle-to-pedestrian front crash test, where some crash prevention systems may struggle due to low light conditions.

== See also ==
- BeSeatSmart Child Passenger Safety Program
- Head injury criterion
- National Highway Traffic Safety Administration
