= Head injury criterion =

Mathematical modeling

The head injury criterion (HIC) is a measure of the likelihood of head injury arising from an impact. The HIC can be used to assess safety related to vehicles, personal protective gear, and sport equipment.

Normally the variable is derived from the measurements of an accelerometer mounted at the center of mass of a crash test dummy’s head, when the dummy is exposed to crash forces.

It is defined as: $\mathit{H}\mathit{I}\mathit{C} = \max_{t_1,t_2} \bigg\{ (t_{2}-t_{1})\cdot \bigg[\frac{1}{t_{2}-t_{1}} \int_{t_{1}}^{t_{2}} a(t) dt \bigg]^{2.5} \bigg\}$

where t_{1} and t_{2} are the initial and final times (in seconds) chosen to maximize HIC, and acceleration a is measured in gs (standard gravity acceleration). The time duration, t_{2} – t_{1}, is limited to a maximum value of 36 ms, usually 15 ms.

This means that the HIC includes the effects of head acceleration and the duration of the acceleration. Large accelerations may be tolerated for very short times.

At a HIC of 1000, there is an 18% probability of a severe head injury, a 55% probability of a serious injury and a 90% probability of a moderate head injury to the average adult.

== Automobile safety ==
HIC is used to determine the U.S. National Highway Traffic Safety Administration (NHTSA) star rating for automobile safety and to determine ratings given by the Insurance Institute for Highway Safety.

According to the Insurance Institute for Highway Safety, head injury risk is evaluated mainly on the basis of head injury criterion. A value of 700 is the maximum allowed under the provisions of the U.S. advanced airbag regulation (NHTSA, 2000) and is the maximum score for an "acceptable" IIHS rating for a particular vehicle.

A HIC-15 (meaning a measure of impact over 15 milliseconds) of 700 is estimated to represent a 5 percent risk of a severe injury (Mertz et al., 1997). A "severe" injury is one with a score of 4+ on the Abbreviated Injury Scale (AIS)

Data for specific vehicles can be found on various automotive review websites. Some sample data is as follows, for comparative purposes:

- The 1998 Ford Windstar, marketed as one of the safest minivans of that year, tested out to a HIC=305 score for driver
- A small car, a 1998 Dodge Neon, tested at HIC=265.
- A common family sedan, a 1998 Toyota Camry, tested at HIC=288.
- A 2007 Camry at HIC=175.

A comprehensive searchable database of vehicles and their HIC scores is available at safercar.gov.

== Athletics and recreation ==
Sport physiologists and biomechanics experts use the HIC in the research of safety equipment and guidelines for competitive sport and recreation. In one study, concussions were found to occur at HIC=250 in most athletes. Studies have been conducted in skiing and other sports to test adequacy of helmets

== See also ==
- Automobile safety
- Crash test
- Sports injury
- Concussion
- Sport-related concussion
- Concussion grading systems
