= Out of position (crash testing) =

Out of position (OOP), in crash testing and car accident medical literature, indicates a passenger position which is not the normal upright and forward-facing position. For example, a common case observed in crashes is the position of an occupant when reaching for the car radio, or panic braking in unbelted passengers. The concept is of interest because small changes in a passenger's position can have profound effects on the actual kinematic response, especially in rear impacts, as shown both in practical testing and theoretical models.

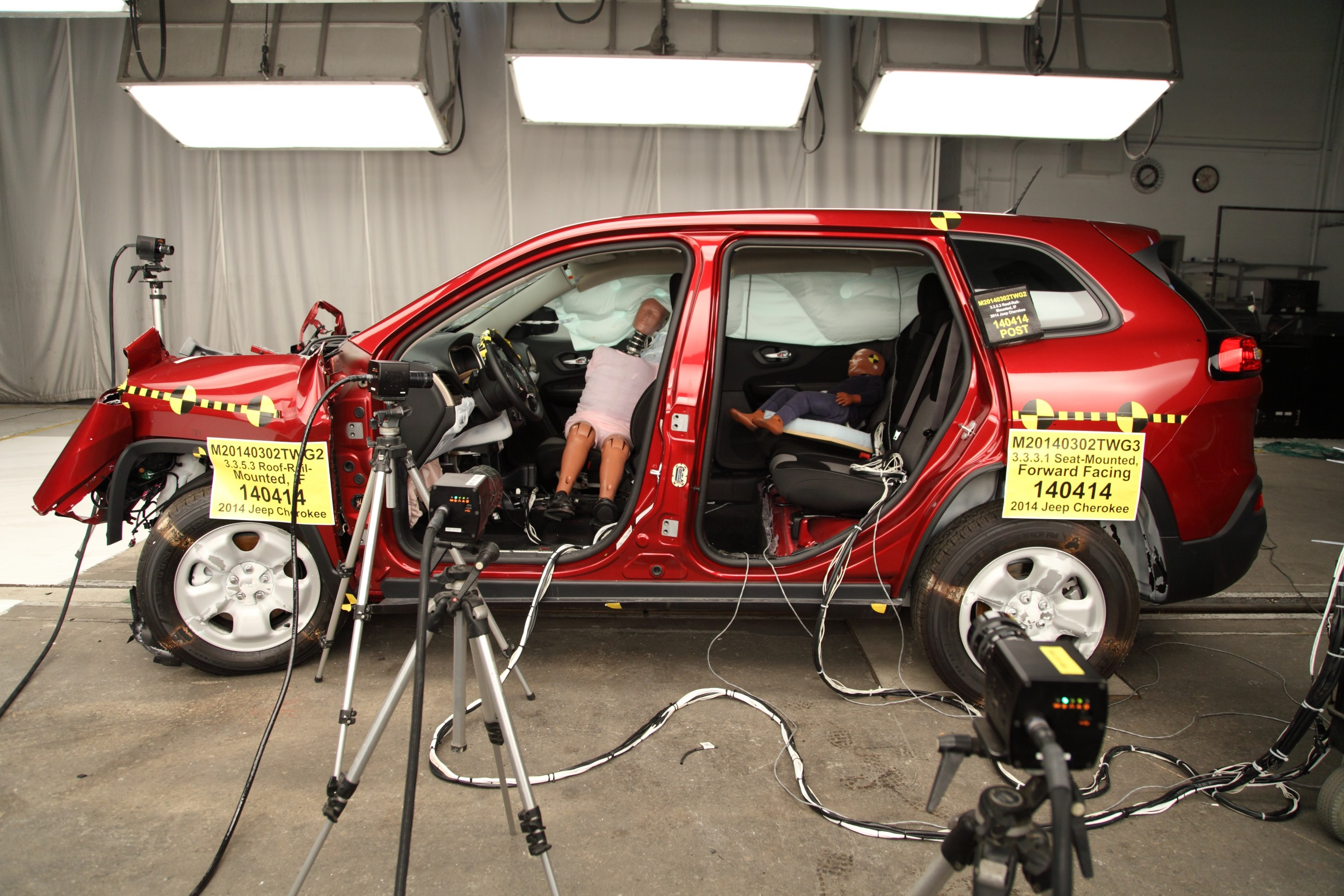
Two crash test dummies inside a Jeep Cherokee after an out-of-position side airbag test.

== Risk of injury ==
Out of position occupants are at increased risk of injury. Even low speed impacts can cause disc herniation and lumbar fracture on OOP passengers. Airbags can prove fatal on OOP passengers: modulating the airbag folding pattern has been proposed as a method to reduce injuries. Crash testing has shown increased forces acting on the neck and torso when dummies were leaning forward and not upright; a partial correlation with the seat stiffness has been observed, with stiffer seats increasing the force loads on the upper neck.

== External Weblinks ==
- U.S. FMVSS 208 Test Configurations
