= DTS =

DTS or DTs may refer to:

== Media and entertainment ==
- Dictionnaire du théâtre en Suisse, an encyclopedia
- Formula 1: Drive to Survive, a Netflix documentary series

== Science and technology ==
- Delirium tremens (DTs), the symptoms associated with alcohol withdrawal
- DTS, Inc., a group of digital sound technologies and a company of the same name
- Distributed temperature sensing, an optoelectronic temperature sensing device
- Distributed transmission system, in broadcasting, as a form of single-frequency network
- Diplomatic Telecommunications Service, a U.S. Department of State telecommunications network
- Digital tomosynthesis, a medical imaging technique

=== Computing ===
- Dispatcher training simulator, a computer system for training operators of electrical power grids
- Data Transformation Services, a Microsoft database tool
- Digital Temperature Sensor, part of Intel's DTS/PECI
- Discoverable Taxonomy Set, part of Extensible Business Reporting Language (XBRL)
- Defense Travel System, the U.S. military's web-based travel system
- Declaration for TypeScript, a file format to describe JavaScript modules to TypeScript
- .dts, file extension of a Devicetree source file

== Organizations ==
- Dallas Theological Seminary, a Christian seminary in Dallas, Texas, US
- Discipleship Training School, a missionary training school offered by Youth with a Mission
- Detective Training School, a training school for Bangladesh Police
- Diversified Technical Systems, an American technology company
- Disneytoon Studios, a defunct animation studio which was owned by Disney

== Transportation ==
- Cadillac DTS, a full-size luxury automobile produced by General Motors
- Destin Executive Airport (FAA lid:DTS),

== Other uses ==
- Dublin Tech Summit, an annual international technology conference held in Dublin, Ireland
- Decline to State, a designation in California voting registration
- Downtown Summerlin (shopping center), in Summerlin, Las Vegas, US
- Dark Time Sunshine, an American hip-hop duo
