= Crash test dummy =

Dummy used in vehicle crash testing

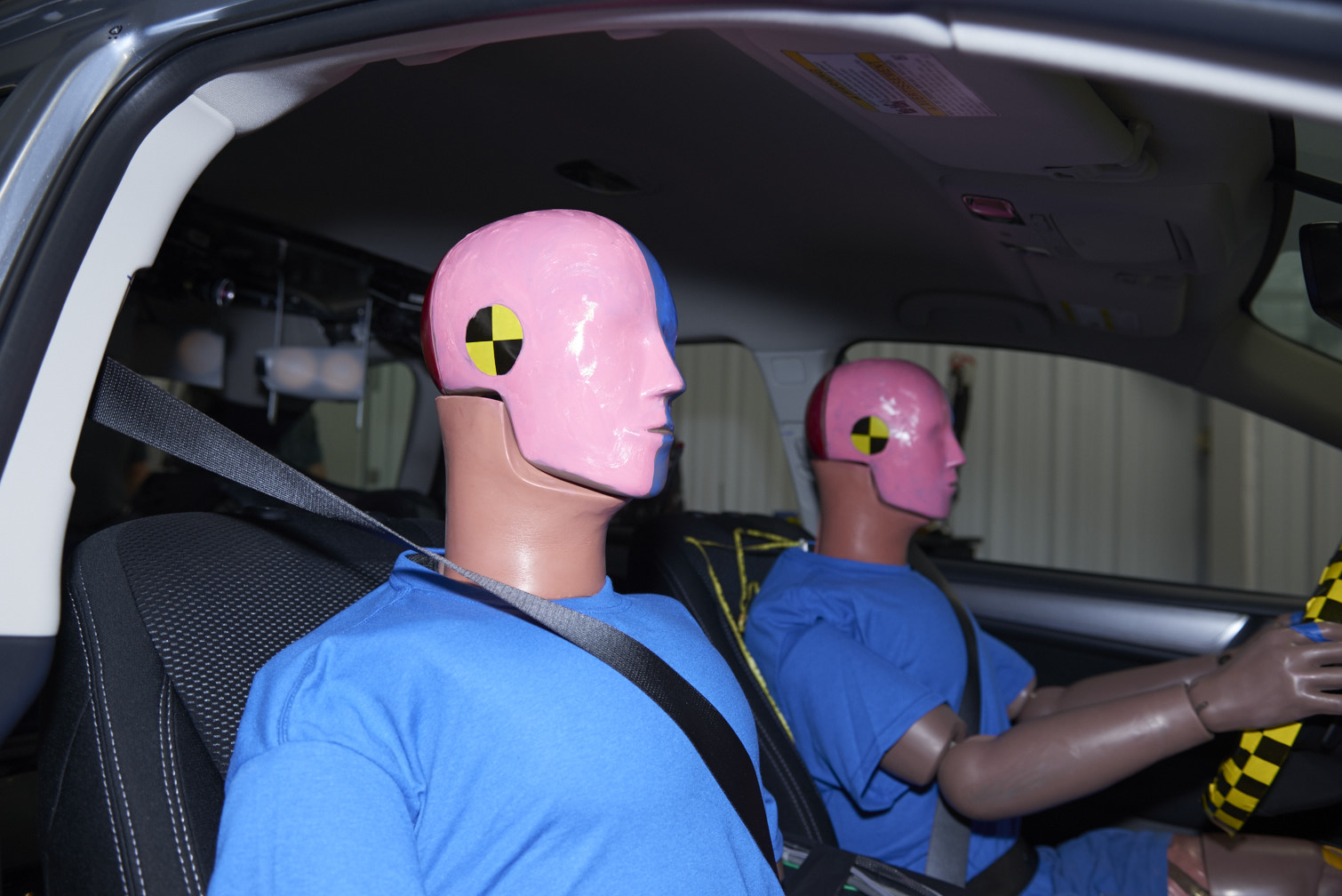
Two male Hybrid III crash test dummies inside a Subaru Outback.

A crash test dummy, or simply dummy, is a full-scale anthropomorphic test device (ATD) that simulates the dimensions, weight proportions and articulation of the human body during a traffic collision. Dummies are used by researchers, automobile and aircraft manufacturers to predict the injuries a person might sustain in a crash. Modern dummies are usually instrumented to record data such as velocity of impact, crushing force, bending, folding, or torque of the body, and deceleration rates during a collision.

Prior to the development of crash test dummies, automobile companies tested using human cadavers, animals and live volunteers. Cadavers have been used to modify different parts of a car, such as the seatbelt. This type of testing may provide more realistic test results than using a dummy, but it raises ethical dilemmas because human cadavers and animals are not able to consent to research studies. Animal testing is not prevalent today. Computational models of the human body are increasingly being used in the industry and research to complement the use of dummies as virtual tools.

There is a constant need for new testing because each new vehicle has a different design, and as technology changes ATDs must be developed to accurately test safety and efficacy.

== History ==
On August 31, 1869, Mary Ward became the first recorded victim of an automobile accident; the car involved was steam-powered (Karl Benz did not invent the gasoline-powered automobile until 1886). Ward, of Parsonstown, Ireland, was thrown out of a motor vehicle and killed. Thirty years later, on September 13, 1899, Henry Bliss became North America's first motor vehicle fatality when hit while stepping off a New York City trolley. The need for a means of analyzing and mitigating the effects of motor vehicle accidents on humans was felt soon after commercial production of automobiles began in the late 1890s, and by the 1930s, when the automobile became a common part of daily life and the number of motor vehicle deaths were rising. Death rates had surpassed 15.6 fatalities per 100 million vehicle-miles continue to climb. (Currently, according to the Centers for Disease Control and Prevention, each year approximately 1.35 million people are killed on roadways around the world).

In 1930 cars had dashboards of rigid metal, non-collapsible steering columns, and protruding knobs, buttons, and levers. Without seat belts, passengers in a frontal collision could be hurled against the interior of the automobile or through the windshield. The vehicle body itself was rigid, and impact forces were transmitted directly to the vehicle occupants. As late as the 1950s, car manufacturers were on public record as saying that vehicle accidents simply could not be made survivable because the forces in a crash were too great.

=== Cadaver testing ===
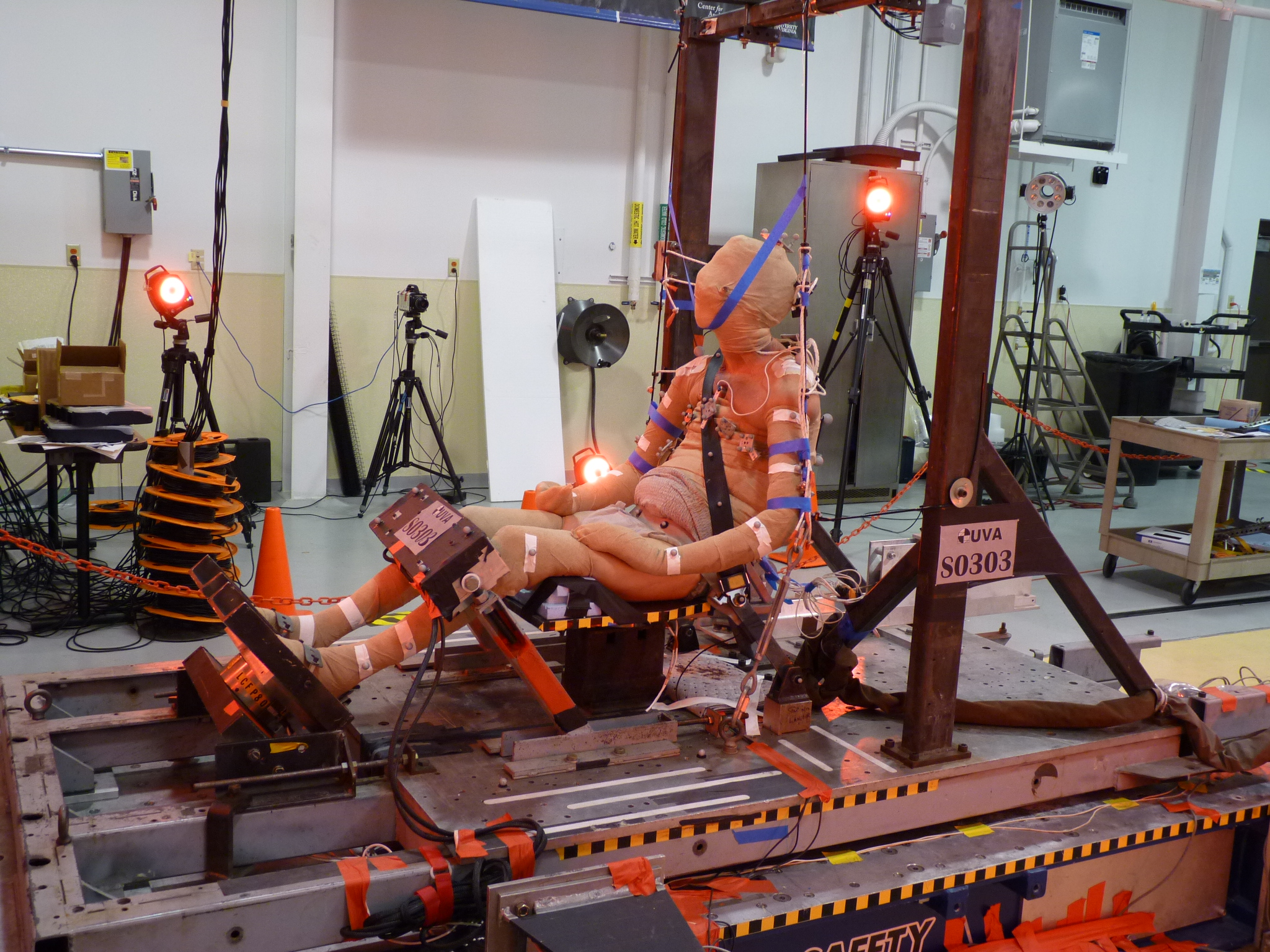
Cadaver used during a frontal impact test.

Detroit's Wayne State University was the first to begin serious work on collecting data on the effects of high-speed collisions on the human body. In the late 1930s there was no reliable data on how the human body responds to the sudden, violent forces acting on it in an automobile accident. Furthermore, no effective tools existed to measure such responses. Biomechanics was a field barely in its infancy. It was therefore necessary to employ two types of test subjects in order to develop initial data sets.

The first test subjects were human cadavers. They were used to obtain fundamental information about the human body's ability to withstand the crushing and tearing forces typically experienced in a high-speed accident. To such an end, steel ball bearings were dropped on skulls, and bodies were dumped down unused elevator shafts onto steel plates. Cadavers fitted with crude accelerometers were strapped into automobiles and subjected to head-on collisions and vehicle rollovers.

Albert King's 1995 Journal of Trauma article, "Humanitarian Benefits of Cadaver Research on Injury Prevention", clearly states the value in human lives saved as a result of cadaver research. King's calculations indicate that as a result of design changes implemented up to 1987, cadaver research since saved 8,500 lives annually. He notes that for every cadaver used, each year 61 people survive due to wearing seat belts, 147 live due to air bags, and 68 survive windshield impact.

However, work with cadavers presented almost as many problems as it resolved. Not only were there the moral and ethical issues related to working with the dead, but there were also research concerns. The majority of cadavers available were older adult males who had died non-violent deaths; they did not represent a demographic cross-section of accident victims. Deceased accident victims could not be employed because any data that might be collected from such experimental subjects would be compromised by the cadaver's previous injuries. Since no two cadavers are the same, and since any specific part of a cadaver could only be used once, it was extremely difficult to achieve reliable comparison data. In addition, child cadavers were not only difficult to obtain, but both legal and public opinion made them effectively unusable. Moreover, as crash testing became more routine, suitable cadavers became increasingly scarce. As a result, biometric data were limited in extent and skewed toward the older males.

Very little attention has been paid to obesity and car crash studies, and it is hard to obtain an obese dummy for the experiment. Instead, human cadavers were used. Body weight is a vital factor when it comes to automobile accidents, and body mass is distributed differently in an obese person versus a non-obese person. At the University of Michigan, obese cadavers were tested and compared to non-obese cadavers, and they found that the obese cadavers had more injuries in their lower extremities. The researchers also suggested that an obese person could be protected by their fat almost causing a "cushioning effect."

The use of NDTs or Neutral Density Targets were implemented inside cadavers' brains to focus on the impact and separation of the brain and skull. NDTs provided detailed observations and allowed researchers to look at a specific area of the brain after the crash stimulation. It also helped to establish and develop the Finite Element model, initially developed to measure neck injuries for three-year-olds. A real child's neck was interpreted and incorporated into the FE model. FE models of the human head have become increasingly more important to the study of head injury.

=== Volunteer testing ===
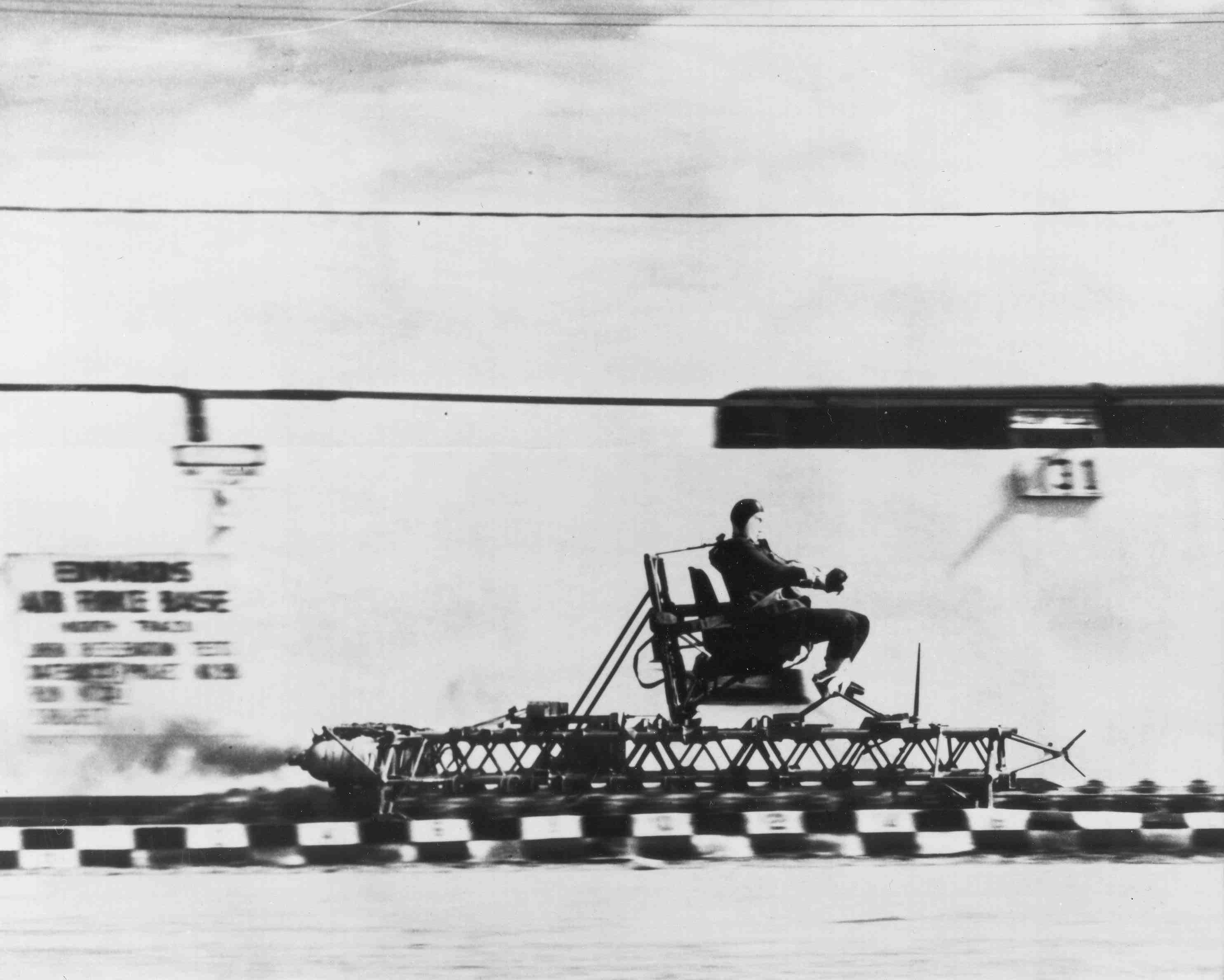
Colonel Stapp riding a rocket sled at Edwards Air Force Base

Some researchers took it upon themselves to serve as crash test dummies. In 1954, USAF Colonel John Paul Stapp was propelled to over 1000 km/h on a rocket sled and stopped in 1.4 seconds. Lawrence Patrick, then a professor at Wayne State University, endured some 400 rides on a rocket sled in order to test the effects of rapid deceleration on the human body. He and his students allowed themselves to be hit in the chest with heavy metal pendulums, impacted in the face by pneumatically driven rotary hammers, and sprayed with shattered glass to simulate window implosion. While admitting that it made him "a little sore", Patrick has said that the research he and his students conducted was seminal in developing mathematical models against which further research could be compared. While data from live testing was valuable, human subjects could not withstand tests that exceeded a certain degree of physical injury. To gather information about the causes and prevention of injuries and fatalities would require a different kind of test subject.

=== Animal testing ===
By the mid-1950s, the bulk of the information cadaver testing could provide had been collected. It was also necessary to collect data on accident survivability, research for which cadavers were woefully inadequate. In concert with the shortage of cadavers, this need forced researchers to seek other models. A description by Mary Roach of the Eighth Stapp Car Crash and Field Demonstration Conference shows the direction in which research had begun to move. "We saw chimpanzees riding rocket sleds, a bear on an impact swing...We observed a pig, anesthetized and placed in a sitting position on the swing in the harness, crashed into a deep-dish steering wheel at about 10 mph."

One important research objective that could not be achieved with either cadavers or live humans was a means of reducing the injuries caused by impalement on the steering column. By 1964, over a million fatalities resulting from steering wheel impact had been recorded, a significant percentage of all fatalities; the introduction by General Motors in the early 1960s of the collapsible steering column reduced the risk of steering-wheel death by fifty percent.

Pigs were used for steering wheel impacts and other cabin collisions because they have an internal structure similar to humans, and can be easily placed correctly via sitting upright in the vehicle. The ability to sit upright was an important requirement for test animals so that another common fatal injury among human victims, decapitation, could be studied. Additionally, it was important for researchers to be able to determine to what extent cabin design needed to be modified to ensure optimal survival circumstances. For instance, a dashboard with too little padding or padding that was too stiff or too soft would not significantly reduce head injury over a dash with no padding at all. While knobs, levers, and buttons are essential in the operation of a vehicle, it was essential to determine which design modifications would best ensure that these elements did not tear or puncture victims in a crash. Rear-view mirror impact is a significant occurrence in a frontal collision: How should a mirror be built so that it is rigid enough to perform its task, yet of low injury risk if struck?

While work with cadavers had aroused some opposition, primarily from religious institutions, it was grudgingly accepted because the dead, being dead, felt no pain, and the indignity of their situations was directly related to easing the pain of the living. Animal research, on the other hand, aroused much greater passion. Animal rights groups such as the American Society for the Prevention of Cruelty to Animals (ASPCA) were vehement in their protest, and while researchers such as Patrick supported animal testing because of its ability to produce reliable, applicable data, there was nonetheless a strong ethical unease about this process. Researchers at the University of Virginia have to call the cadaver's family and tell them what they are using their loved one for, after getting consent from the family. This seems to lessen ethical dilemmas in contrast to animal testing, because there is no sufficient way to get consent to use an animal.

Although animal test data were still more easily obtained than cadaver data, the anatomical differences between animals and humans, and the difficulty of employing adequate internal instrumentation, limited their usefulness. Animal testing is no longer practiced by any of the major automobile makers; General Motors discontinued live testing in 1993 and other manufacturers followed suit shortly thereafter.

In 1980, animals such as bears and pigs were tested in car crash simulations. This led to moral dilemmas and was not the first time that animals were used in car crashes. In 1978, The University of Michigan Highway Safety Research Institute used baboons as a substitute for human test subjects in car crashes. This led to the objection of animal cruelty, but also stirred controversy regarding baboons' similarity to humans and usage as a sufficient testing substitution. The researchers did not end up stopping the use of baboons because of moral objections, but instead stopped because they had collected sufficient data. The moral inputs from other people and organizations were inconsistent, which caused implications when deciding to ban healthy animals from research testing. The animals were put under anesthesia to spare them from immediate pain, but the aftereffects could not justify their use in the tests. General Motors used animals for testing and also suggested putting the animals under anesthesia, then killing them after completing the testing.

Although the University of Michigan Highway Safety Research Institute did receive bad publicity, it was suggested that this is not the reason why they stopped using baboons. The University of Michigan's mission was to create safer cars for human use. In order to reach this goal, research and testing were inevitable. The cruelty and the moral dilemmas of animal testing did not trump researchers' Co tinier use of animals as subjects. They reasoned that biomechanics data were needed for an experiment like this, which would lead to safer cars. Years later, animal testing ceased and instead an instrumented dummy was created as a replacement. In 1978, animals were their only subjects that could be a reliable substitution for humans. The disadvantage, though, to using an instrumented dummy or a human cadaver, is that the tissue is not alive and will not elicit the same response as a live animal. By 1991, the use of animals in vehicle collision tests was in decline because of advances in computers and technology. It is difficult to use cadavers instead of animals because of legal issues, and it is difficult to obtain permission from the families of the deceased. Consent for a research and testing can occur only if the person responsible for giving consent is mentally competent and comprehends the research and testing procedures fully.

== Dummy evolution ==
There are a growing number of specialized dummies used to gather data not only for men but for women, children, the elderly and the obese; and data for rib and spinal impacts. THOR is a very advanced dummy that uses sensors and has a humanlike spine, pelvis, and can capture neck data in 6DOF (six degrees of freedom) motion. Special classes of dummies called Hybrid IIIs are designed to research the effects of frontal impacts, but are less useful in assessing the effects of other types of impact, such as side impacts, rear impacts, or rollovers. Hybrid IIIs are built to represent specific ages; for example: a typical ten-year-old, six-year-old, three-year-old, or a grown man. The equipment that is put on, or in, dummies to gather data is also evolving and the most up-to-date equipment is embedded inside the ATD to create a more biofidelic response for more accurate data.

=== Sierra Sam and VIP-50 ===
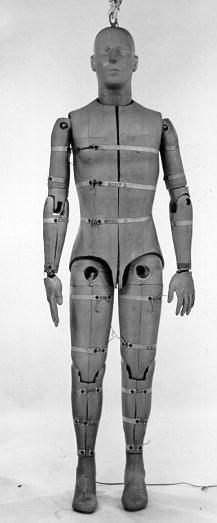
Sierra Sam tested ejection seats.

The information gleaned from cadaver research and animal studies had already been put to some use in the construction of human simulacra as early as 1949, when "Sierra Sam" was created by Samuel W. Alderson at his Alderson Research Labs (ARL) and Sierra Engineering Co. to test aircraft ejection seats, aviation helmets and pilot restraint harnesses. This testing involved the use of high acceleration to 1,000 km/h (620 mph) rocket sleds, beyond the capability of human volunteers to tolerate. In the early 1950s, Alderson and Grumman produced a dummy which was used to conduct crash tests in both motor vehicles and aircraft. The original "Sierra Sam" was a 95th percentile male dummy (heavier and taller than 95% of human males).

Alderson went on to produce what it called the VIP-50 series, built specifically for General Motors and Ford, but which was also adopted by the National Bureau of Standards. Sierra followed up with a competitor dummy, a model it called "Sierra Stan".

=== Hybrid I and II ===
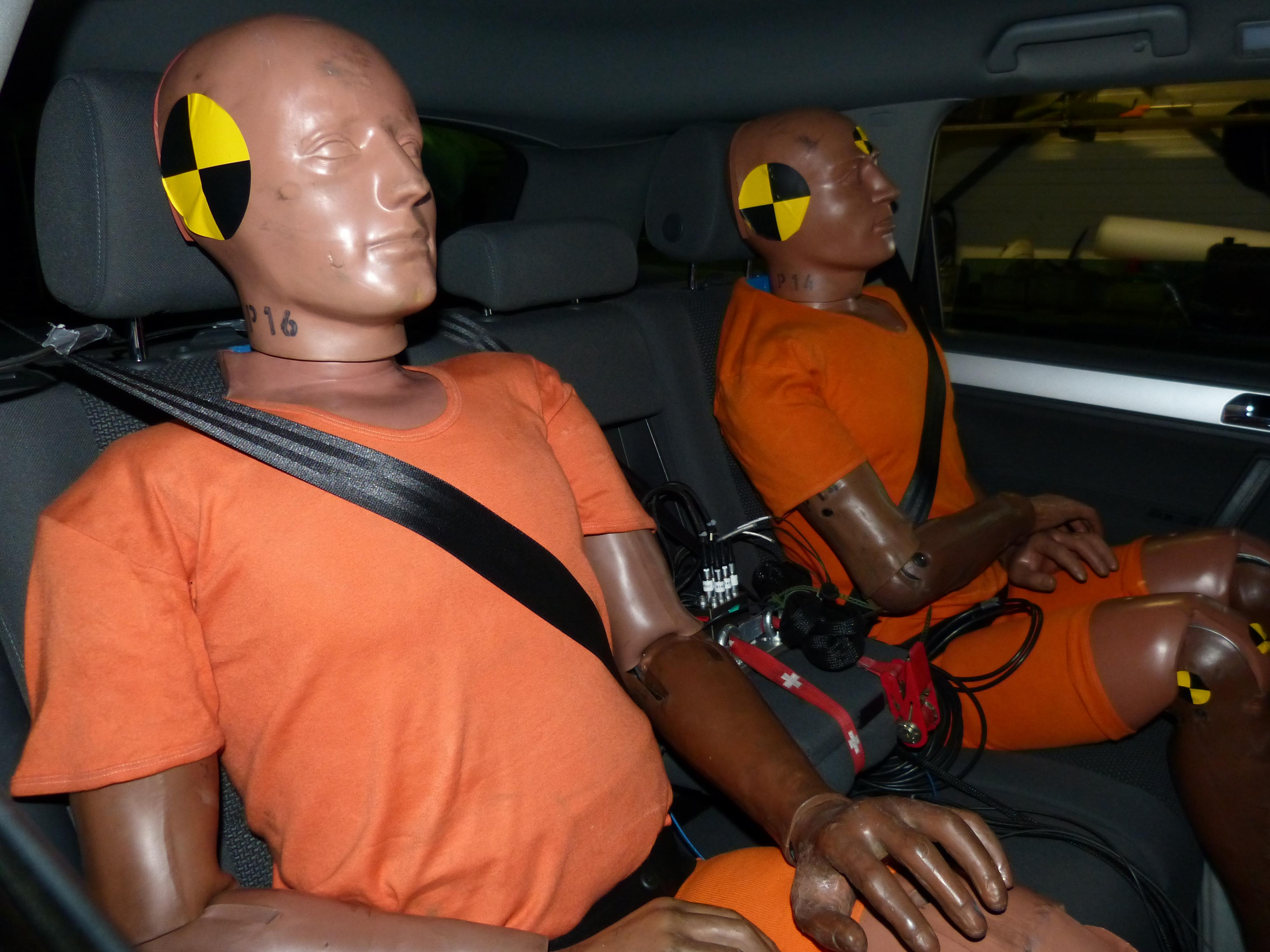
Two uninstrumented Hybrid II 50th percentile male dummies used as ballast in a low speed collision test.

General Motors, who had taken over the impetus in developing a reliable and durable dummy, found neither Sierra model satisfied its needs. GM engineers decided to combine the best features of the VIP series and Sierra Stan, and so in 1971 Hybrid I was born. Hybrid I was what is known as a "50th percentile male" dummy. That is to say, it modeled an average male in height, mass, and proportion. In cooperation with the Society of Automotive Engineers (SAE), GM shared this design with its competitors.

Since then, considerable work has gone into creating more and more sophisticated dummies. Hybrid II was introduced in 1972, with improved shoulder, spine, and knee responses, and more rigorous documentation. Hybrid II became the first dummy to comply with the American Federal Motor Vehicle Safety Standard (FMVSS) for testing of automotive lap and shoulder belts. In 1973, a 50th percentile male dummy was released, and the National Highway Traffic Safety Administration (NHTSA) undertook an agreement with General Motors to produce a model exceeding Hybrid II's performance in a number of specific areas.

Though a great improvement over cadavers for standardized testing purposes, Hybrid I and Hybrid II were still very crude, and their use was limited to developing and testing seat belt designs. A dummy was needed which would allow researchers to explore injury-reduction strategies. It was this need that pushed GM researchers to develop the current Hybrid line, the Hybrid III family of crash test dummies.

=== Hybrid III family ===
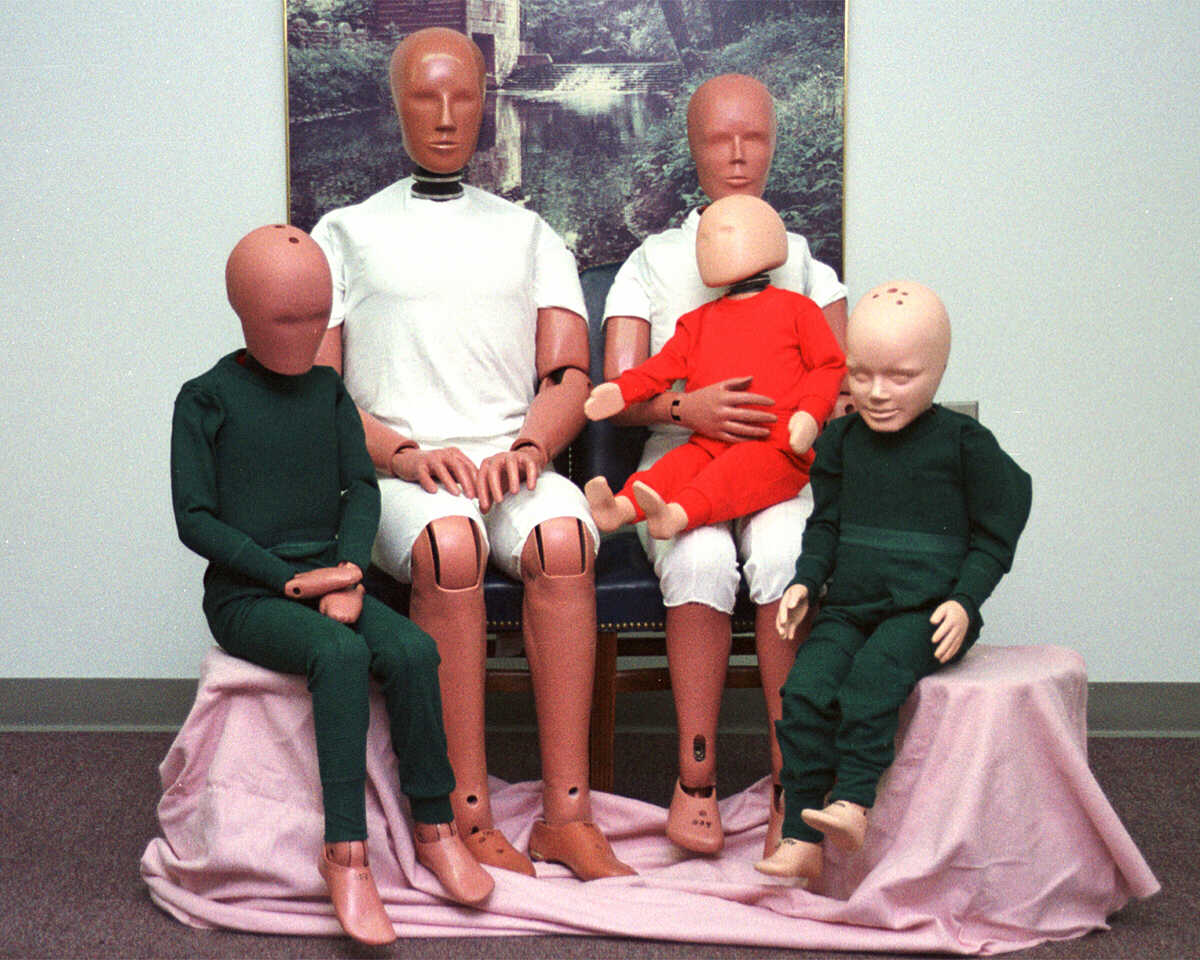
The original 50th percentile male Hybrid III's family expanded to include a 95th percentile male, 5th percentile female, and ten, six, and three-year-old child dummies.

Hybrid III, the 50th percentile male dummy which made its first appearance in 1976, is the familiar crash test dummy, and he is now a family man. If he could stand upright, he would be 175 centimetres (5 feet 9 inches) tall and would have a mass of 77 kg (170 lb). He occupies the driver's seat in all the Insurance Institute for Highway Safety (IIHS) 65 km/h (40 mph) offset frontal crash tests. He is joined by a "big brother", the 95th percentile Hybrid III, at 188 centimetres (6 feet 2 inches) and 100 kg (220 lb). Ms. Hybrid III is a 5th percentile female dummy, at a diminutive 152 cm (4.99 ft) tall and 50 kg (110 lb). The three Hybrid III child dummies represent a ten-year-old, 21 kg (46 lb) six-year-old, and a 15 kg (33 lb) three-year-old. The child models are very recent additions to the crash test dummy family; because so little hard data are available on the effects of accidents on children and such data are very difficult to obtain, these models are based in large part on estimates and approximations. The primary benefit provided by the Hybrid III is improved neck response in forward flexion and head rotation that better simulates the human.

The Hybrid III dummy for three-, six- and ten-year-olds has its limitations, and does not provide the same physical outcome a human would encounter with a frontal crash. It was found that when testing the three-year-old Hybrid III dummy, it showed that frontal crashes would most likely cause cervical spine injuries. When using data from the real world, the results did not match up to the Hybrid III stimulation injuries. To get around this, THUMS was created which stands for Total Human Model of Safety. The model can be easily relatable to the human body anatomically especially focusing on the human spine upon impact. Clinical testing and experiments are more accurate than a dummy and more reliable case studies can be implemented with this model. The model is based on a male only, and mimics human tissues and organs. This model is accurate for males in the 50th percentile, and it can not easily relate to three-year-olds when dealing with neck and head injuries, which are responsible for 57 percent of car crash fatalities. Instead, the FE model can be appropriately implemented for these criteria.

There are certain testing procedures for Hybrid IIIs to ensure that they obtain a correct humanlike neck flexure, and to ensure that they would react to a crash in a similar way that human bodies would.

=== Test device for Human Occupant Restraint (THOR) ===
==== THOR-50M mid-size male ====
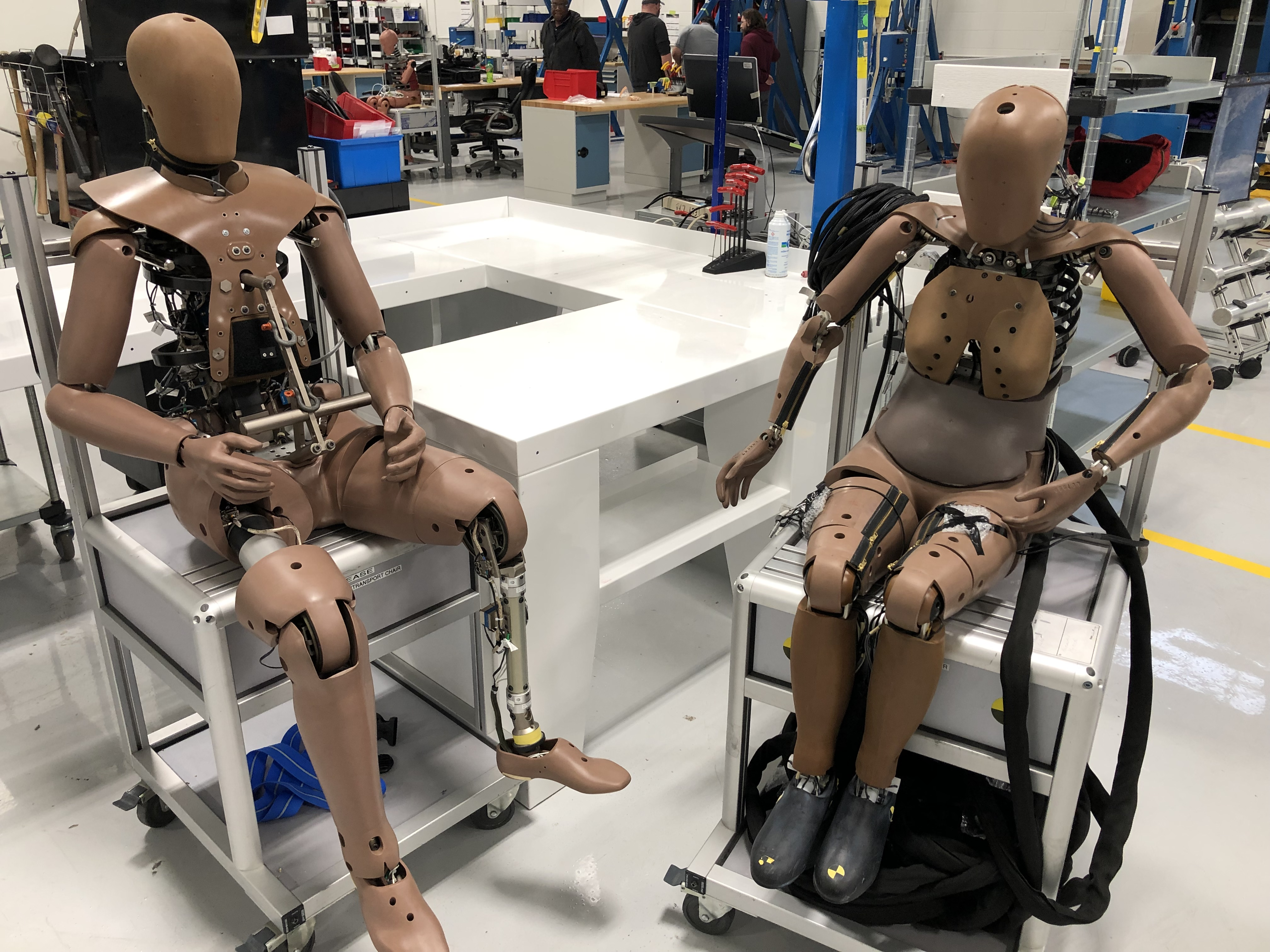
THOR-50M & THOR-5F Crash Test Dummies

THOR is an advanced crash test dummy designed to expand the Hybrid-III test dummy capabilities in assessing frontal impacts. THOR-50M, the mid-size male, was created to improve human-like anthropometry and increase the instrumentation for mitigating injury.

Although development started in the 1990s, with the latest design update by the National Highway Traffic Safety Administration (NHTSA) in contract with Humanetics, the first new prototypes were delivered in 2013. Since then, Europe's New Car Assessment Program became the first agency to adopt THOR into testing protocols, replacing the Hybrid III mid-sized male in the driver's seat.

==== THOR-5F small female ====
The small female version of THOR is based on the technology of the male version, but has more female-like anthropometry to represent females in frontal impact testing.

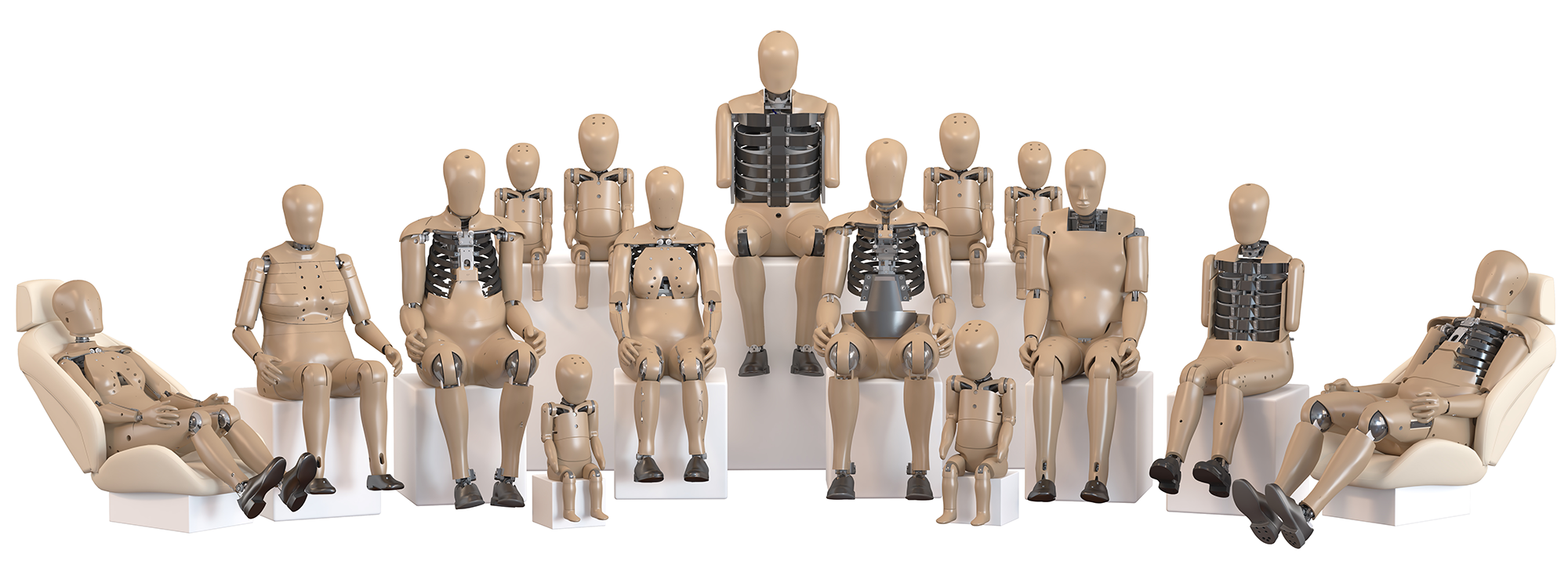
Current family of advanced crash test dummies used today.

The female THOR and the lack of female test dummies has received new interest as gender equity issues have emerged citing the lack of female crash test dummies and availability of new technology in regulation testing. A Center for Applied Biomechanics, University of Virginia, paper published in 2019 citing the increased risk of injury in female automobile occupants which started a fresh examination into female impact testing and protection.

The THOR dummies can accommodate 150+ channels of data collection throughout their bodies.

=== Warrior Injury Assessment Manikin (WIAMan) ===
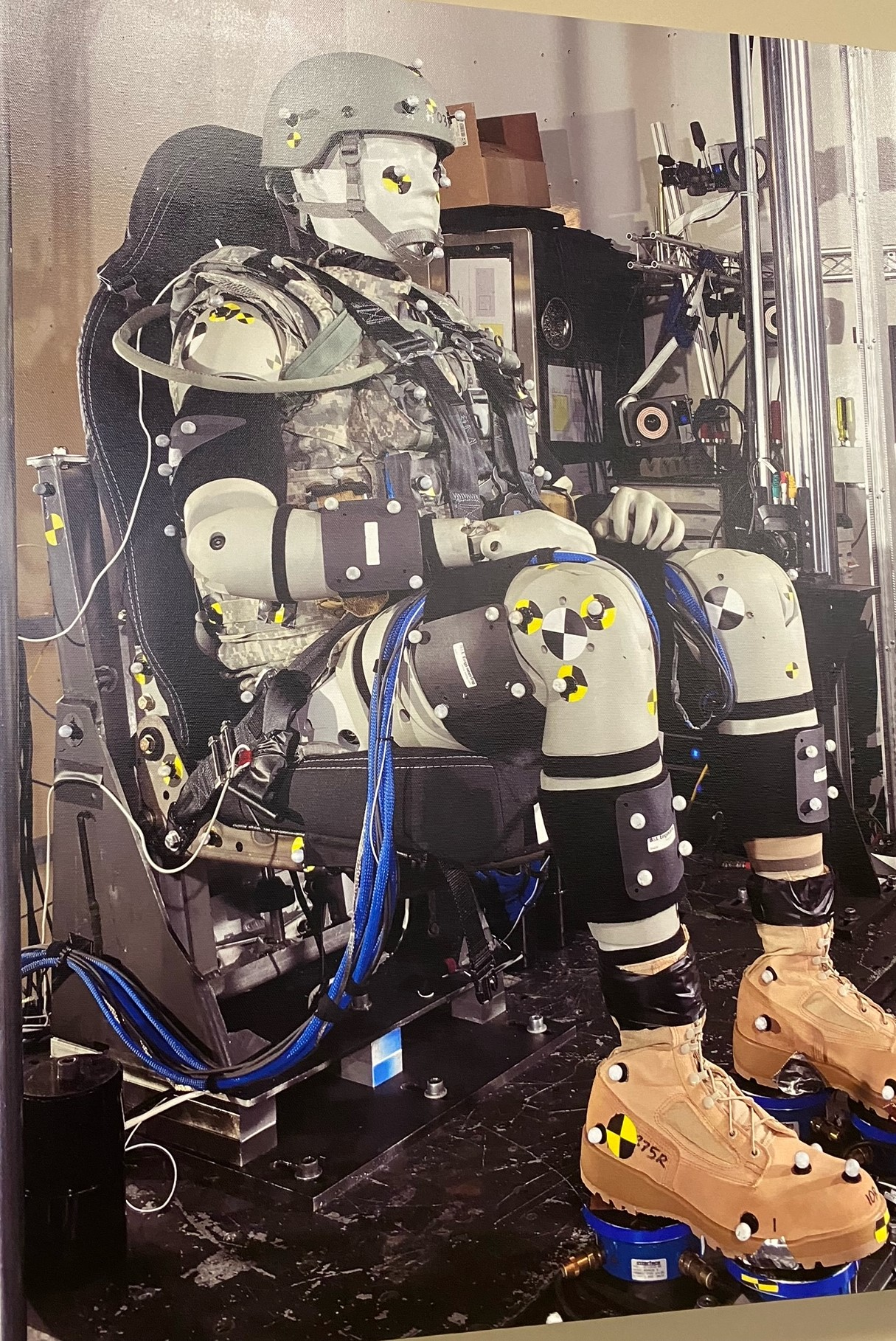
U.S. Army Warrior Injury Assessment Manikin (WIAMan)

WIAMan is a blast test dummy designed to assess potential skeletal injuries of soldiers exposed to under-body blast (UBB). Designed jointly by the U.S. Army and Diversified Technical Systems (DTS), the project includes an anthropomorphic test device and in-dummy data acquisition and sensor solution. Since the project started in February 2015, two generations of WIAMan prototypes have undergone a series of lab tests and blast events in the field.

With the prototype's delivery in 2018, WIAMan evaluates the effects of under-body blasts involving vehicles, and assess the risk to soldiers in ground vehicle systems. The goal of the WIAMan project is to acquire data that will improve the design of military vehicles and personal protective equipment. WIAMan and the platform created to simulate an IED explosion are undergoing continued testing.

Test dummies of the past were intended for the auto industry and lacked the same response a human would have to explosions. A challenge for the Army has been to develop a crash test dummy that moves enough like a human body to get an accurate result. The Army is working to make the mannequin "biofidelic," meaning it can match human movement. At 5-feet-11-inches tall and 185 lbs., WIAMan is based on the size and movement of an average soldier.

U.S. Army Research Laboratory and its partners at Johns Hopkins University Applied Physics Lab completed biofidelity testing in 2017. The purpose of the testing was to develop a dummy capable of predicting specific injury risk to occupants in a vehicle during live-fire tests, based on human response data.

The manikin supports up to 156 channels of data acquisition, measuring different variables a soldier may experience in a vehicle blast. WIAMan includes self-contained internal power and the world's smallest data acquisition system called SLICE6, based on SLICE NANO architecture, eliminating the huge mass of sensor cables normally exiting dummies. The data measured within WIAMan includes forces, moments, accelerations and angular velocity. The DEVCOM Analysis Center (DAC) processes WIAMan data via a software analysis tool called the Analysis of Manikin Data, or AMANDA. On Feb. 2, 2022, AMANDA was accredited by the U.S. Army Test and Evaluation Command for use in live fire test and evaluation.

=== Female crash test dummies ===
Crash test dummies have been commonly based on males, even though women make up 62% of all car buyers in the USA. This leads to oversights in automotive safety and ergonomics for this demographic. In 2003, the National Highway Traffic Safety Administration (NHTSA) introduced the female Hybrid III into collision testing. This dummy was a scaled-down version of its male counterpart, representing the 5th percentile of women based on mid-1970s standards.

In 2002, Volvo pioneered the development of a virtual crash test dummy representing a midsized pregnant female. Collaborating with Chalmers University of Technology, they also crafted a computer model of an average-sized female to advance their whiplash protection system. Other car companies have also adopted computer models in their safety testing to simulate crashes.

In May 2023, the world's first female crash test dummy was used in a crash test at the Swedish National Road and Transport Research Institute in Linköping, Sweden. Dr. Astrid Linder led the team of researchers to develop the female crash test dummy which represented the height and weight of women at the 50th and 25th percentiles. The model was created after crash statistics showed that female bodies are more prone to other injuries than male, such as whiplash. The female dummy was developed with the help of an EU project.

== Testing procedure ==
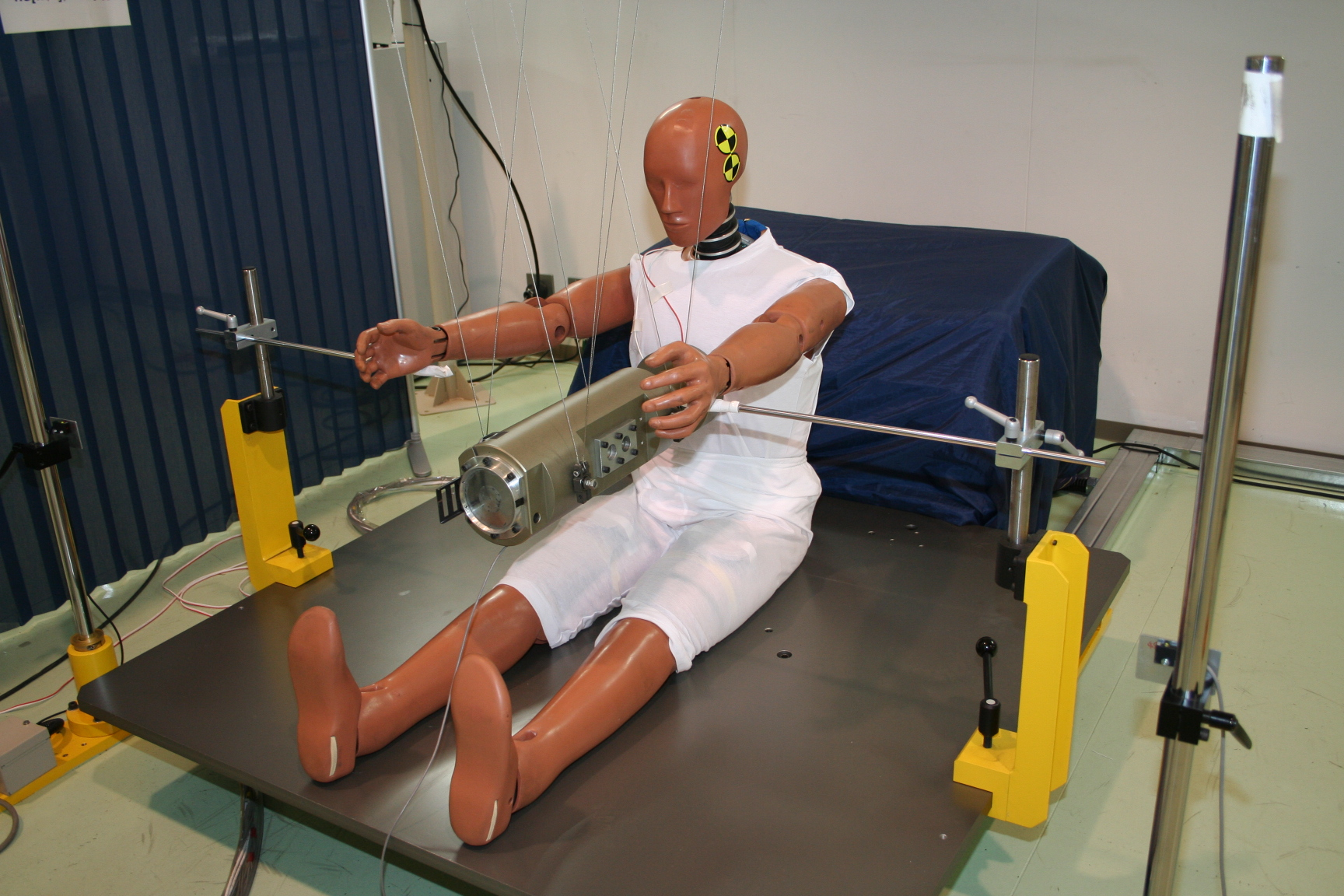
Hybrid III undergoing calibration

Every Hybrid III undergoes calibration prior to a crash test. Its head is removed and then dropped from 40 centimetres (16 in) to calibrate the head instrumentation. Then the head and neck are reattached, set in motion, and stopped abruptly to check for proper neck flexure. Hybrids wear chamois leather skin; the knees are struck with a metal probe to check for proper puncture. Finally, the head and neck are attached to the body, which is attached to a test platform and struck violently in the chest by a heavy pendulum to ensure that the ribs bend and flex as they should.

When the dummy has been determined to be ready for testing, calibration marks are fastened to the side of the head to aid researchers when slow-motion films are reviewed later. The dummy is then placed inside the test vehicle, set to seating position and then marked on the head and knees. Up to fifty-eight data channels located in all parts of the Hybrid III, from the head to the ankle, record between 30,000 and 35,000 data items in a typical 100–150 millisecond crash. These data are recorded in a temporary data repository in the dummy's chest and then downloaded to a computer once the test is complete.

Because the Hybrid is a standardized data collection device, any part of a particular Hybrid type is interchangeable with any other. Not only can one dummy be tested several times, but if a part should fail, it can be replaced with a new part. A fully instrumented dummy is worth about €150,000.

=== Positioning and restraints ===
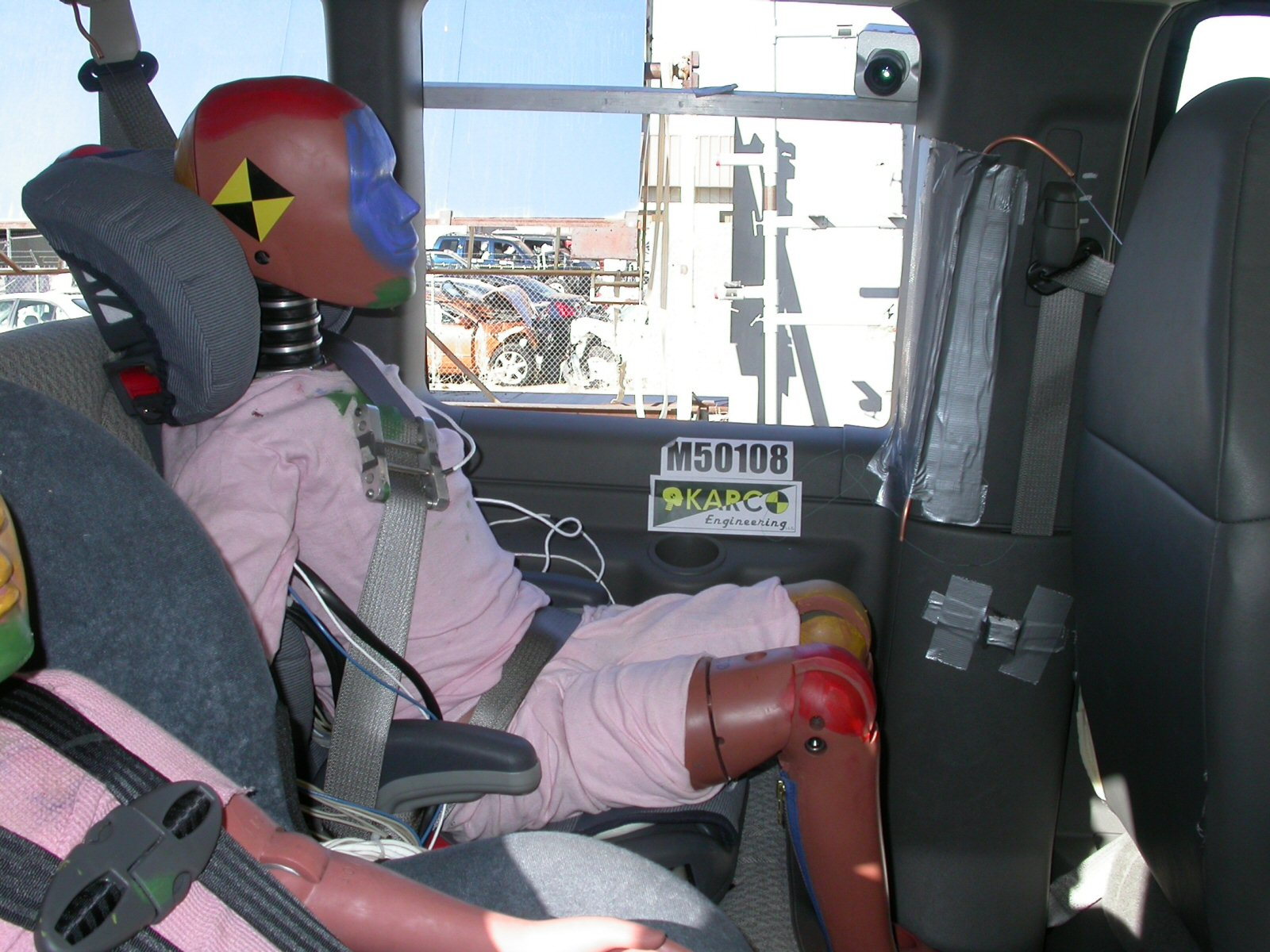
10-year-old Hybrid III dummy in a booster seat after a frontal crash test.

Children in the three-year-old age group are more likely to have a fatality because it is the age where positioning is crucial. In some countries, children transition from facing the rear of the car to facing the front at this age. A study was done on restraints and positioning of three-year-olds. It was concluded that being restrained and in the front seat has a lower fatality rate than children positioned in the back seat but not restrained. The safety results indicated that children should be placed in the back seat and restrained. It also suggests that restraints have a bigger impact on safety than seating positions. A lap belt used on children will not provide as much safety as it would for an adult, due to the flexibility of children. An adult seatbelt could do more harm to a child than good, which is why children should properly be utilizing the Child Restraint System instead. This system includes a booster seat and a proper belt that fits the child's criteria including age, weight and height.

=== Specialized dummies ===
Hybrid IIIs are designed to research the effects of frontal impacts, and are less useful in assessing the effects of other types of impact, such as side impacts, rear impacts, or rollovers. After head-on collisions, the most common severe injury accident is the side impact.

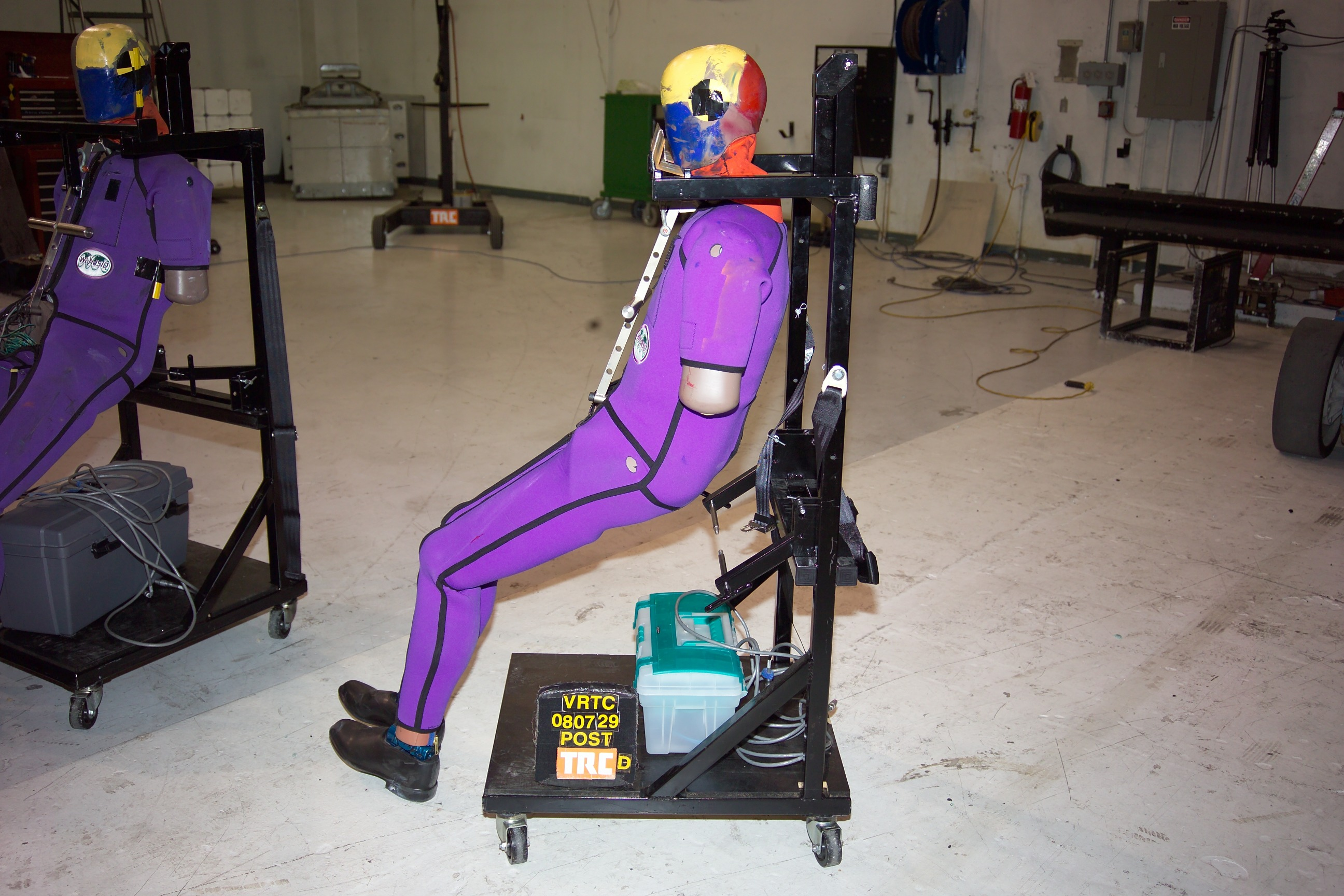
WorldSID is an advanced side impact ATD, used for EuroNCAP side impact test modes.

- The SID (Side Impact Dummy) family of test dummies is designed to measure rib, spine, and internal organ effects in side collisions. It also assesses spine and rib deceleration and compression of the chest cavity. SID is the United States government testing standard, EuroSID is used in Europe to ensure compliance with safety standards, and SID II(s) represents a 5th-percentile female. BioSID is a more sophisticated version of SID and EuroSID, but is not used in a regulatory capacity. The WorldSID is a project to develop a new generation of dummy under the International Organization for Standardization.
- BioRID is a dummy designed to assess the effects of a rear impact. Its primary purpose is to research whiplash, and to aid designers in developing effective head and neck restraints. BioRID is more sophisticated in its spinal construction than Hybrid; 24 vertebra simulators allow BioRID to assume a much more natural seating posture, and to demonstrate the neck movement and configuration seen in rear-end collisions.

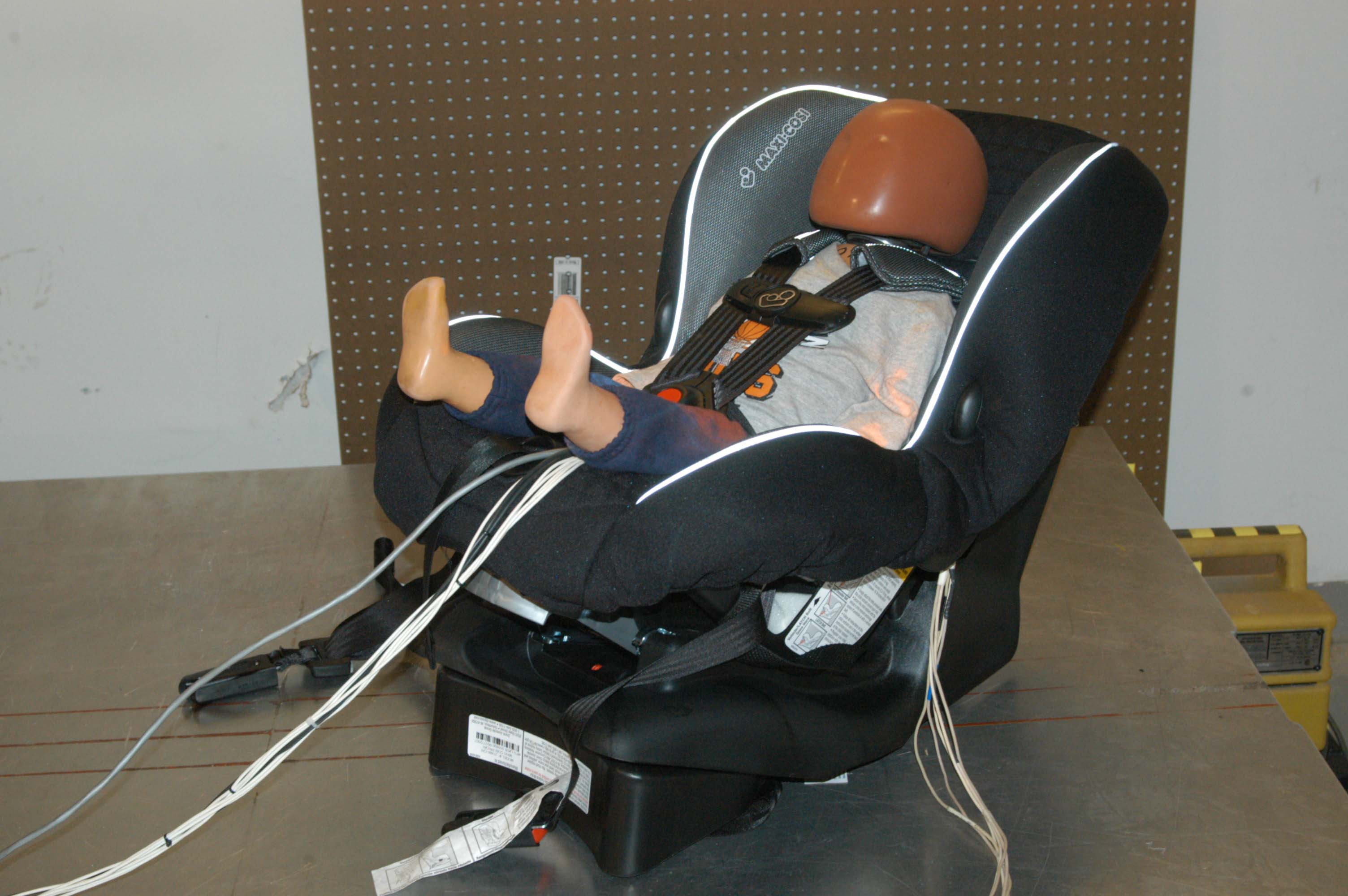
12-month-old CRABI dummy in a child safety restraint seat.

- CRABI is a child dummy used to evaluate the effectiveness of child restraint devices, including seat belts and air bags. There are three models of the CRABI, representing 18-month, 12-month, and 6-month-old children.
- FGOA is a first generation obese anthropometric test device which can be used to study the automotive safety challenges for obese occupants, who are believed to have higher risk of mortality in automobile collisions comparing to non-obese occupants.

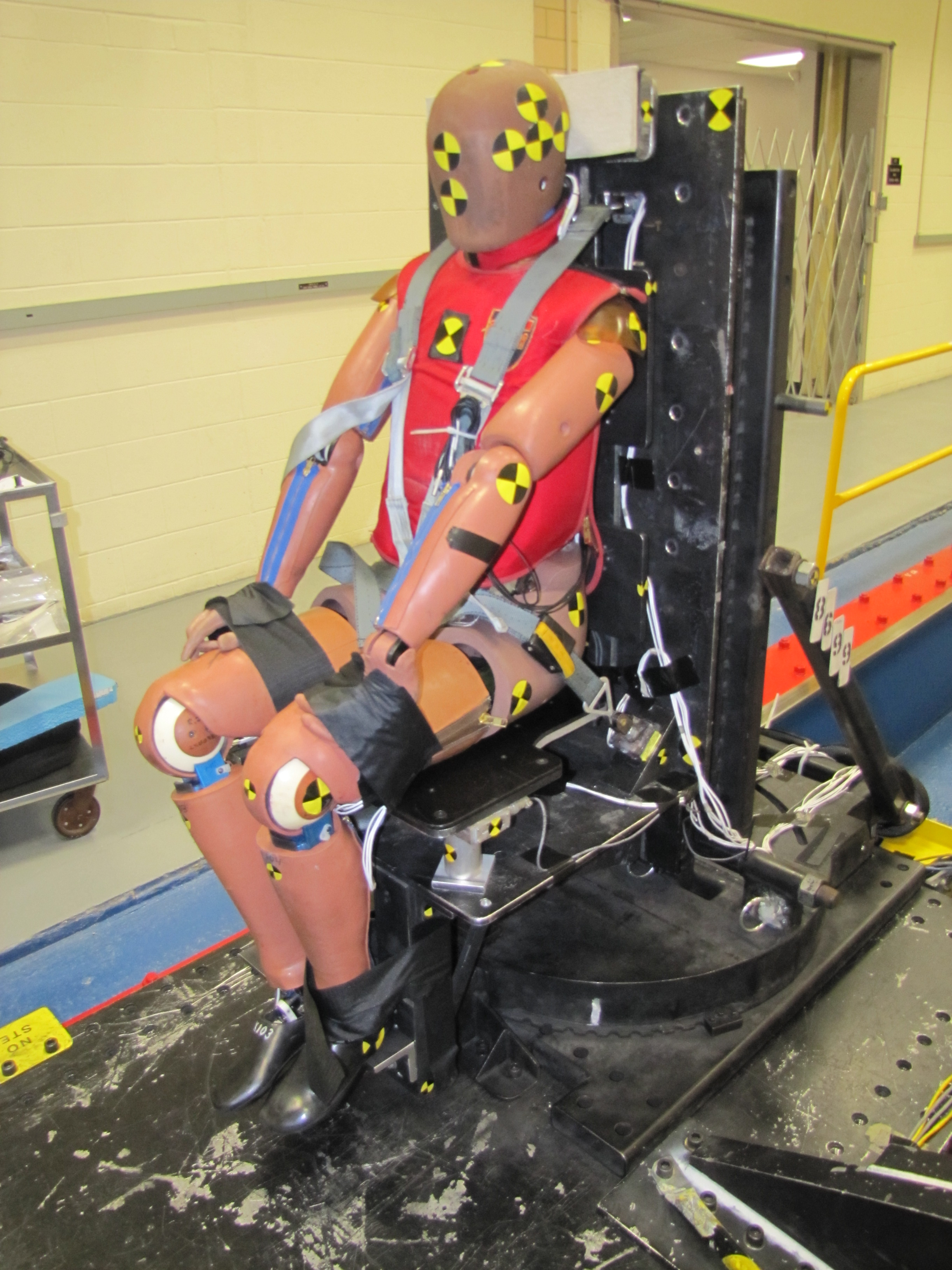
THOR offers sophisticated instrumentation for assessing frontal-impacts

- THOR is currently the most advanced dummy on the market. The successor of Hybrid III, THOR has a more human-like spine and pelvis, and its face contains a number of sensors which allow analysis of facial impacts to an accuracy currently unobtainable with other dummies. THOR's range of sensors is also greater in quantity and sensitivity than those of Hybrid III. THOR's original manufacturer, GESAC Inc., ceased production after the slowdown of the auto industry in the late 2000s. THOR was being further developed, and two other companies were working on similar dummies; NHTSA's ultimate goal for this government-funded project was the development of a single THOR dummy, but THOR dummy development stopped. FTSS, bought by Humanetics, and DentonATD both continued to produce the THOR LX and THOR FLX.
- THOR-05F in November 2025, the National Highway Traffic Safety Administration released the design details and plans for implementation for an "advanced small female frontal crash test dummy with improved response and measurement capabilities. Its shape and response in a crash are based on female bodies, which will ultimately enable better assessment of brain, thorax, abdominal, pelvic and lower leg injury risk for small female occupants."
- Linda is a virtual pregnant crash dummy developed by Volvo engineer Laura Thackray in 2002. Linda is modelled in her 36th week of pregnancy to analyze the effects of high-speed impact on the womb, placenta, and fetus.
- Animal models have been used to test the safety of dog harnesses and crates in crash conditions.

== Regulation ==
For the purpose of U.S. regulation and Global Technical Regulations and for clear communication in safety and seating design, dummies carry specifically designated reference points, such as the H-point; these are also used, for example, in automotive design.

== Popular culture ==
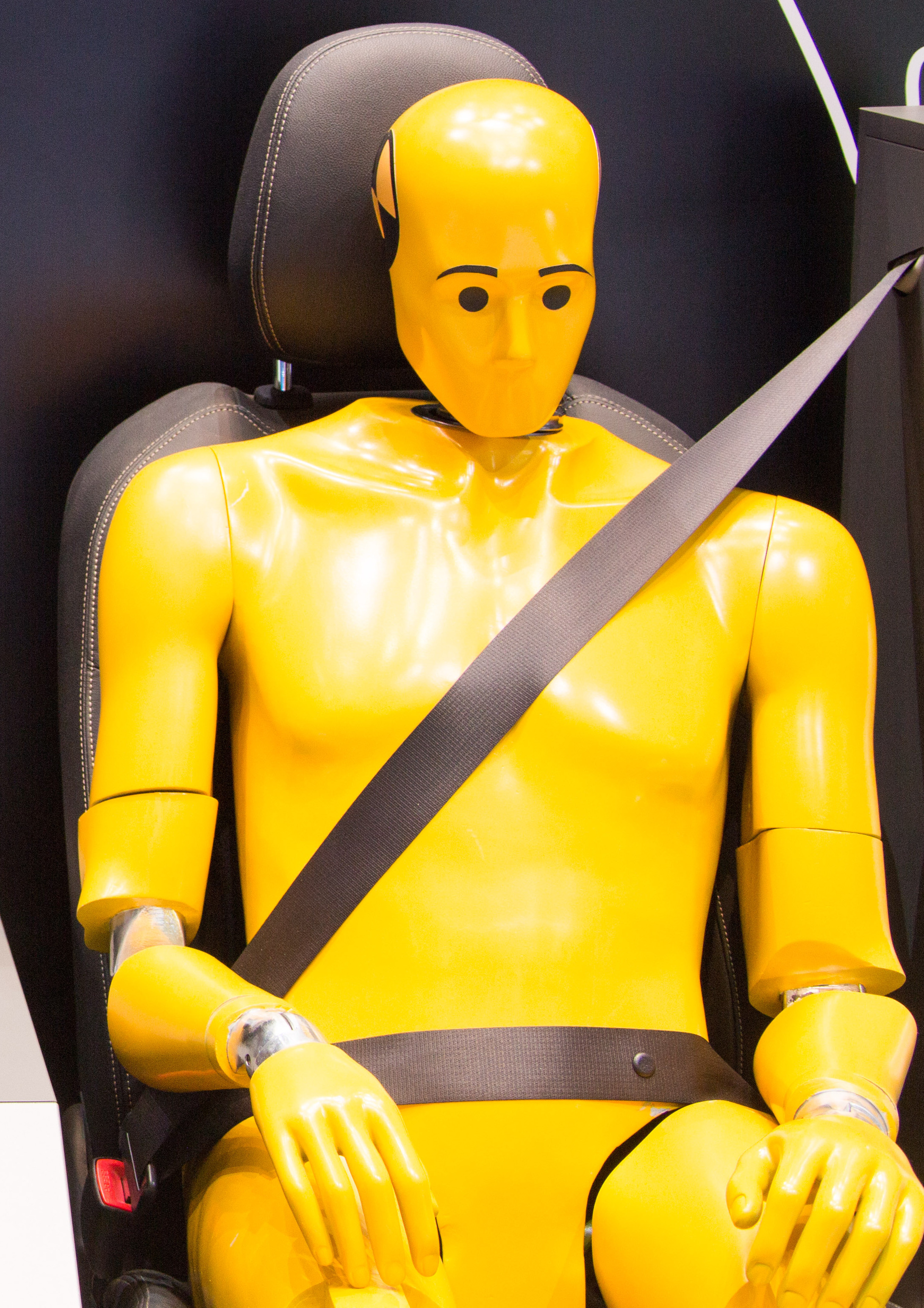
Crash test dummy with a three-point seat belt.

- In 1986, the National Highway Traffic Safety Administration (NHTSA), a division of the United States Department of Transportation, launched a series of public service announcements in magazines and on television featuring two talking crash dummies named Vince (voiced by Jack Burns) (played by Tony Reitano) and Larry (voiced by Lorenzo Music) (played by Tom Harrison, later replaced by Whitney Rydbeck) who modelled seat belt safety practices through their slapstick antics, with the slogan "You Could Learn a Lot from a Dummy". By the time the campaign was retired in 1999, seat belt usage had risen from 21% to 67%. Since then crash dummy characters have continued to be used in seat belt safety campaigns, especially those aimed at children.
- In the early 1990s, Tyco Toys created a line of action figures called The Incredible Crash Dummies based on the characters from the NHTSA television advertisements. They were intended to fall apart at the touch of a button on their abdomens. Vehicles that could be crashed into walls and broken were also produced. Dummies and vehicles were easily reassembled. They prompted a half-hour television special, The Adventures of the Incredible Crash Dummies. Unique for its time, the cartoon was produced entirely using 3D computer animation techniques. A comic book series and a video game for the Nintendo Entertainment System, Super Nintendo Entertainment System, Game Boy and other gaming consoles were produced.
- In 2004, a series of "Crash Dummies" animated shorts were commissioned for the FOX network. Related toys from Mattel's Hot Wheels brand were produced.
- The television series MythBusters employed a Hybrid II model crash test dummy, "Buster", for dangerous experiments. Additionally, the show utilized a number of simulaids in addition to using the hosts themselves as the test subjects if the experiment was safe enough.
- In Discovery Kids children's educational series Crash Test Danny, the title character is a living crash test dummy, played by Ben Langley, who gets crushed, blown up, and pulled apart in the name of science.
- In 2014, Secret Exit Ltd. released Turbo Dismount, a game where the player puts a crash test dummy in different vehicles to send them off into crashes.
- In 2020, actor Aamir Khan played a crash test dummy in a series of advertisements for Indian tire manufacturer CEAT Tyres.

== See also ==
- Car accident
- Chicken gun, impact simulator to measure damages on the vehicle side.
- Crash test
- Crashworthiness
- Euro NCAP
- Safety car
- Mannequin
- Crash simulation
- Secchi disk, the characteristic test-dummy fiducial marker symbol.
