= Astrid Linder =

Swedish engineer

- Occupations: engineer and researcher in motor vehicle safety
- Employer(s): Swedish National Road and Transport Research Institute, Chalmers University of Technology
- Awards: U.S. Government Award for Safety Engineering Excellence

Astrid Linder is a Swedish engineer and researcher in motor vehicle safety. She created the first average-sized female crash test dummy. For her contributions to the field, Linder was awarded EU Champions of Transport Research Competition and U.S. Government Award for Safety Engineering Excellence. In November 2023, Linder was named to the BBC's 100 Women list.

== Career ==
Linder completed a PhD in mechanical engineering in the field of traffic safety in 2002. She has worked on the safety of both men and women during car accidents, but her pioneering work focuses on addressing the safety of women in road accidents, who are twice as much at risk compared to men drivers. Linder champions equal safety assessment for men and women, as the crash dummy often used by the industry (based on male morphology) does not account for weight distribution and dynamic responses of females. As a solution, Linder, along with her colleagues, developed EvaRID – an anthropomorphic average female virtual crash test dummy for safety assessment of women in vehicles. EvaRID has potential to be an instrumental tool in evaluating the safety of female drivers in cars.

Her expertise includes biomechanics, occupant kinematics, vehicle crash injury prevention, mathematical simulations and dynamic testing. She currently holds the position of professor of Traffic Safety at Swedish National Road and Transport Research Institute and adjunct professor at Chalmers University of Technology.
