= Magnus Gens =

Swedish engineer

- Education: KTH Royal Institute of Technology
- Known for: Building a crash test dummy moose
- Awards: Ig Nobel Prize (2022)
- Scientific career
- Fields: Safety engineering; IT engineering
- Thesis: Moose Crash Test Dummy (2001)

Magnus Gens is a Swedish engineer known for his development of a moose crash test dummy in his 2001 master's thesis. In 2022, the thesis earned him the Ig Nobel Prize for safety engineering, which honors unusual but important research.

== Thesis ==
In 1994, Gens began working on his master's thesis at the KTH Royal Institute of Technology in Stockholm which involved the creation of a crash test dummy to emulate an automobile collision with a moose in order to improve safety in vehicles. During the process, he worked alongside the Swedish National Road and Transport Research Institute (Swedish: Statens väg- och transportforskningsinstitut, VTI) and the auto manufacturer Saab. Gens also consulted with a veterinarian and the Kolmården Zoo in order to become acquainted with the animal's physical characteristics. The vehicle crash tests were performed on two relatively-new Saab 9-5s and one older Volvo 245 at the Saab facility in Trollhättan.

In 2001, Gens published his master's thesis, Moose Crash Test Dummy, with the Swedish National Road and Transport Research Institute. The moose itself was built using 116 rubber plates which were fastened together with steel tubes and wiring. The thesis provided data on how moose hit vehicles and the dummy is designed to be hit several times before a replacement is necessary. Prior to publication, VTI had been asked to provide horse and camel analogs for testing and similar testing for kangaroo–vehicle collisions had begun in Australia.

=== Use in auto safety ===
Elk/Moose Crash Test - Volvo V70 Estate (70 Km/h)
- Volvo V70 crash at 70 km/h (43 mph) using Gens's model
- https://www.youtube.com/watch?v=98ZK_kknP9U

Gens's thesis has been the basis of tests in several countries. Moose crash test dummies based on his design have been in a large number of automobile safety tests in Sweden and Spain. Saab's participation in the study helped to start its reputation as a "moose-proof vehicle manufacturer". In 2008, the television show MythBusters obtained Gens's permission to use a modified version of his model in testing a moose auto collision theory in the episode "Alaska Special".

== Award ==
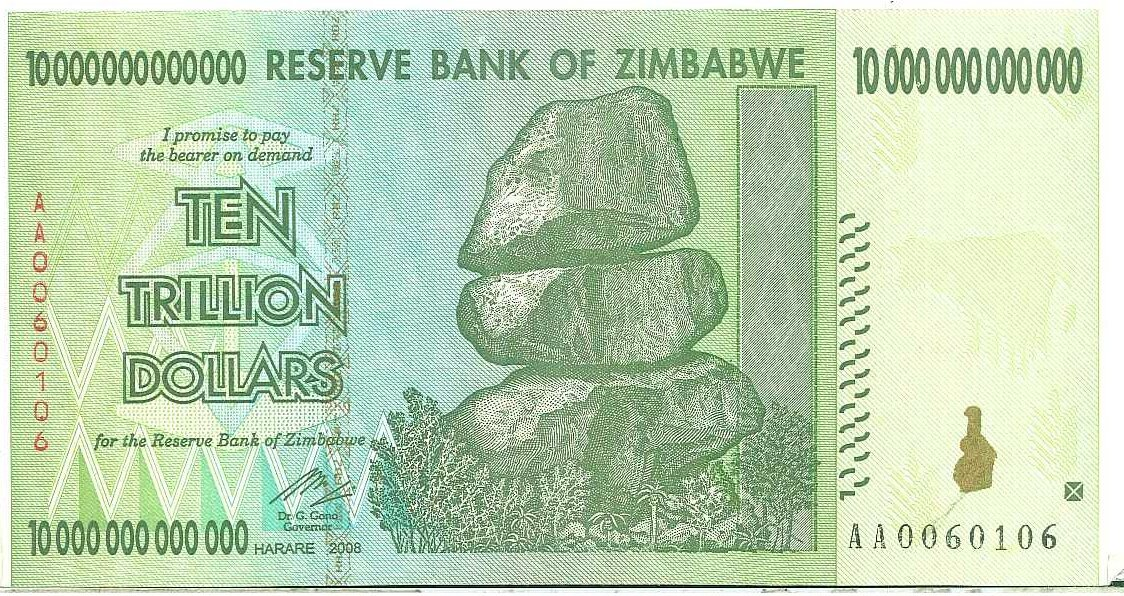
For his thesis, Gens was awarded a 10 trillion Zimbabwe dollar banknote.

In 2022, Gens was awarded the Ig Nobel Prize, an award for "research that makes people laugh, but also think", in safety engineering. The cash prize was a ten trillion Zimbabwean dollar banknote.

Although initially frustrated that his work did not receive much traction at publication, he has expressed hope that renewed attention to the paper will bring more attention to automobile accidents involving wildlife. As a result of the award, Gens was offered an open invitation to lecture at Harvard University.

== See also ==
- Moose test – an automobile evasion test
- Deer–vehicle collisions
- Wildlife crossing
- Roadkill
- Epidemiology of motor vehicle collisions
