= Gary Carpenter =

British animator

Gary Carpenter is an animation director, comedy writer, and creator of King Nutter - the site that monitors eBay items in the news.

His animated series Celebrity High (2001) for Channel 4 / E4 / Talkback earned him finalist as Director of Best Comedy Series at the 2002 British Animation Awards.

His most recent animated project was a video for Radiohead track 'Nasty People', notable for being shot and edited in camera as one take on the Super 8 format.

Crash Test Danny (2006), a science sketch show for the Discovery Kids network, saw Gary in his first on-screen television appearance as The Professor, which he also co-wrote.
