= The Incredible Crash Dummies (TV special) =

1993 animated television special

- Genre: Animated TV Special
- Developed by: Savage Steve Holland; Bill Kopp
- Written by: Savage Steve Holland; Bill Kopp
- Directed by: Mark Mariutto
- Voices of: John Stocker; Dan Hennessey; James Rankin; Michael Caruana; Lee MacDougall; Richard Binsley; Paul Haddad; Susan Roman
- Theme music composer: Jim Morgan; Ray Parker; Tom Szczesniak
- Composer: Acrobat Music
- Countries of origin: United States; Canada
- Original language: English

Production
- Executive producers: Michael Hirsh; Patrick Loubert; Clive A. Smith; Larry Lamb
- Producers: Pam Lehn; Stephen Hodgins
- Animators: Mark Mariutto; Ron Pitts
- Editor: Al Maciulis
- Running time: 22 minutes
- Production companies: Nelvana; Lamb&Company; Tyco Industries

Original release
- Network: Fox Kids
- Release: May 1, 1993

The Incredible Crash Dummies is a 1993 animated television special. In the United States, it originally aired on Fox Kids. It was later repacked as a video to be sold with two of the Crash Dummy action figures (Ted and a "purple/gold" repainted Junkman) as well as a mail-in offer to order. Like the TV ad the series was based on the "You Could Learn a Lot from a Dummy" PSAs, episodes would have the characters announcing at the end "Don't you be a dummy, buckle your safety belts...and leave the crashing to us!" It was the first full-length television cartoon created using computer graphics.

== Plot ==
Dummyland is a fictional world inhabited only by living crash dummies. Many make a living testing cars, just like the real ones.

The story begins with crash dummy professor Dr. Zub has creating a new "uncrashable" prototype armor called the Torso 9000 and is testing it with the help of crash dummy Ted. Unfortunately the initial trial run goes awry and Ted's head is severed from his body. The following night however, Ted is accidentally replaced with the head of the evil Junkman, who can now harness the power of the Torso 9000 and manages to break free from the Crash Test facility.

Plotting to destroy the crash dummies, the Junkman sets up his base near an abandoned scrap heap and creates an army of killing machines out of spare car parts. When a valuable disc of information on the Torso 9000 is stolen, and finally Dr. Zub himself is kidnapped, heroes Slick & Spin step in to save the day.

== Cast ==
- John Stocker as Dr. Zub/Horst
- Dan Hennessey as Junkman
- James Rankin as Slick/Jackhammer
- Michael Caruana as Spin
- Lee MacDougall as Ted
- Richard Binsley as Spare Tire/Pistonhead
- Paul Haddad as Bull/Daryl
- Susan Roman as Computer Voice

== Production ==
=== Computer Hardware & Software ===
Silicon Graphics workstations were used in production utilizing Wavefront Technologie's modeling and animation software
