= Lee MacDougall =

Canadian actor, writer and theatre director

Lee MacDougall is a Canadian actor, writer and theatre director. Originally from Kirkland Lake, Ontario, he studied at the University of Toronto and Ryerson University before launching his career as an actor.

He acted primarily on stage, as well as having guest roles in film and television, until writing his first play, High Life, in the early 1990s. A comedy-drama based on a group of drug addicts he met while acting in a regional theatre production, the play won the Dora Mavor Moore Award for Outstanding New Play, Mid-Sized Theatre Division, in 1996, and was a shortlisted Governor General's Award finalist for English-language drama at the 1997 Governor General's Awards. He later wrote the screenplay for the 2009 film adaptation High Life, for which he received a Genie Award nomination for Best Adapted Screenplay at the 31st Genie Awards.

His later plays have included The Gingko Tree, Resistance, Her Wonders and an adaptation of W. O. Mitchell's novel Who Has Seen the Wind. He has also published a number of short stories.

As an actor, he is now most noted for his role in the original cast of the musical Come from Away.

He lives in Stratford, Ontario with his husband, theatre director and choreographer Tim French.

== Filmography ==
Television and Film
Year	Title	Role	Notes
1990	Dracula: The Series	Dr. Benedict	(TV Series), 1 episode: "The Boffin"
1991	Beyond Reality	Perry	(TV Series), 1 episode: "Asylum"
1991	Mark Twain and Me	Porter	(Disney TV Movie)
1991	The Making of Monsters	The teacher	(Short film)
1993	The Incredible Crash Dummies	Ted (voice role)	(Animated TV Movie)
1998	Eerie, Indiana: The Other Dimension	Mr. Covington	(TV Series), 1 episode: "The Goody Two-Shoes People"
1999	The Lady in Question	(Unnamed role)	(TV Movie)
1999	Twice in a Lifetime	Stage Manager '79	(TV Series), 1 episode: "What She Did for Love"
2004	Doc	Logan	(TV Series), 1 episode: "Daddy Dearest"
2005	Cheaper by the Dozen 2	Doobner Dad	(Film)
2005	The Newsroom	Rick - Professor	(TV Series), 1 episode: "Lolita"
2007	Love You to Death	Minister	(TV Series), 1 episode: "The Bog Murder"
