= Humanetics =

American manufacturer of crash test dummies

- Type: Private
- Industry: Industrial Technology: Safety Equipment, Simulation software, Sensor technology
- Founded: June 2012; 14 years ago
- Headquarters: Farmington Hills, Michigan
- Key people: Christopher O'Connor, President and CEO
- Products: Crash test dummies, anthropomorphic test devices, Active safety equipment
- Number of employees: 750 (October 2018)
- Parent: Humanetics Group
- Website: humanetics.humaneticsgroup.com

Humanetics is the largest manufacturer of anthropomorphic test devices (ATDs), commonly known as crash test dummies, as measured by market share. Headquartered in Farmington Hills, Michigan, the company is a subsidiary of Humanetics Group, itself owned by Bridgepoint Capital, a private equity firm.

== History ==
One of the companies that would become Humanetics was founded as Humanoid Systems in Beverly Hills, California in 1973 by Sam Alderson, an inventor and engineer. Alderson had previously founded and sold Alderson Research Laboratories, an early manufacturer of dummies for ejector seat testing for the Air Force. Humanoid Systems won large contracts with General Motors and Ford to sell crash test dummies for $20,000 each.

In 1990, Alderson Research Laboratories and Humanoid Systems merged to form First Technology Safety Systems (FTSS).

In 1999, FTSS acquired the dummy-development and manufacturing business of the Netherlands Organization for Applied Scientific Research.

In 2001, FTSS acquired HITEC Sensor Solutions, an American manufacturer of specialized strain gage applications.

In December 2005, FTSS was acquired by Honeywell.

In March 2006, Honeywell announced they were selling FTSS to a private equity firm.

In 2008, Christopher O’Connor, a retired U.S. Army colonel and former General Electric Co. executive with an engineering background became CEO of FTSS.

In 2009, Humanetics was formed by Chicago private equity firm Wynnchurch Capital Ltd. FTSS with Milan Township Ohio-based ATD company Denton ATD Inc. The subsidiaries Humanetics, HITEC Sensor Solutions and Sensor Developments Inc. were placed under a holding company, Safety Technology Holdings Inc (STH), based in Farmington Hills, Michigan.

In December 2013, Wynnchurch Capital Ltd sold STH to San Francisco-based private equity company Golden Gate Capital.

In 2014, the company began producing heavier dummies with a higher body mass index to more accurately replicate crash results involving heavier humans.

In February 2015, STH acquired FronTone GmbH, an Austrian manufacturer of safety-test equipment.

In February 2017, STH acquired Fibercore Limited, a British manufacturer of specialty optical fibers. Also in February, STH signed an exclusive agreement with AICON 3D Systems to provide vehicle safety testing systems.

In February 2018, London-based investment firm Bridgepoint acquired STH from Golden Gate Capital. In March, STH acquired DSD Testing GmbH, an Austrian manufacturer of safety-test equipment. In May, Humanetics began 3D printing dummies. In October, STH's HITEC Sensors division acquired United Kingdom-based Aero Sense Technologies, a manufacturer of custom sensors for aerospace and industrial customers.

In January 2019, Humanetics and several automakers and suppliers including BMW, Jaguar Land Rover, Zoox, Faurecia and Autoliv formed the Advanced Driving Systems Consortium, to develop seating standards that the NHTSA can use for autonomous vehicles. In February, Safety Technology Holdings purchased laser processing equipment company OpTek Systems.

In July 2020, STH renamed itself as Humanetics Group.

In March 2021, Humanetics Group acquired design firm Human Solutions GmbH and body scanning firm Avalution GmbH, both based in Kaiserslautern, Germany.

In June 2022, Humanetics announces that mg-sensor GmbH, specialists in the design and development of high-quality sensors, data acquisition and calibration services, is officially joining Humanetics Group.

In July 2022, Humanetics announces the acquisition of ATD-LabTech GmbH, an independent supplier of testing systems, as well as a service and consulting provider.

== Products ==
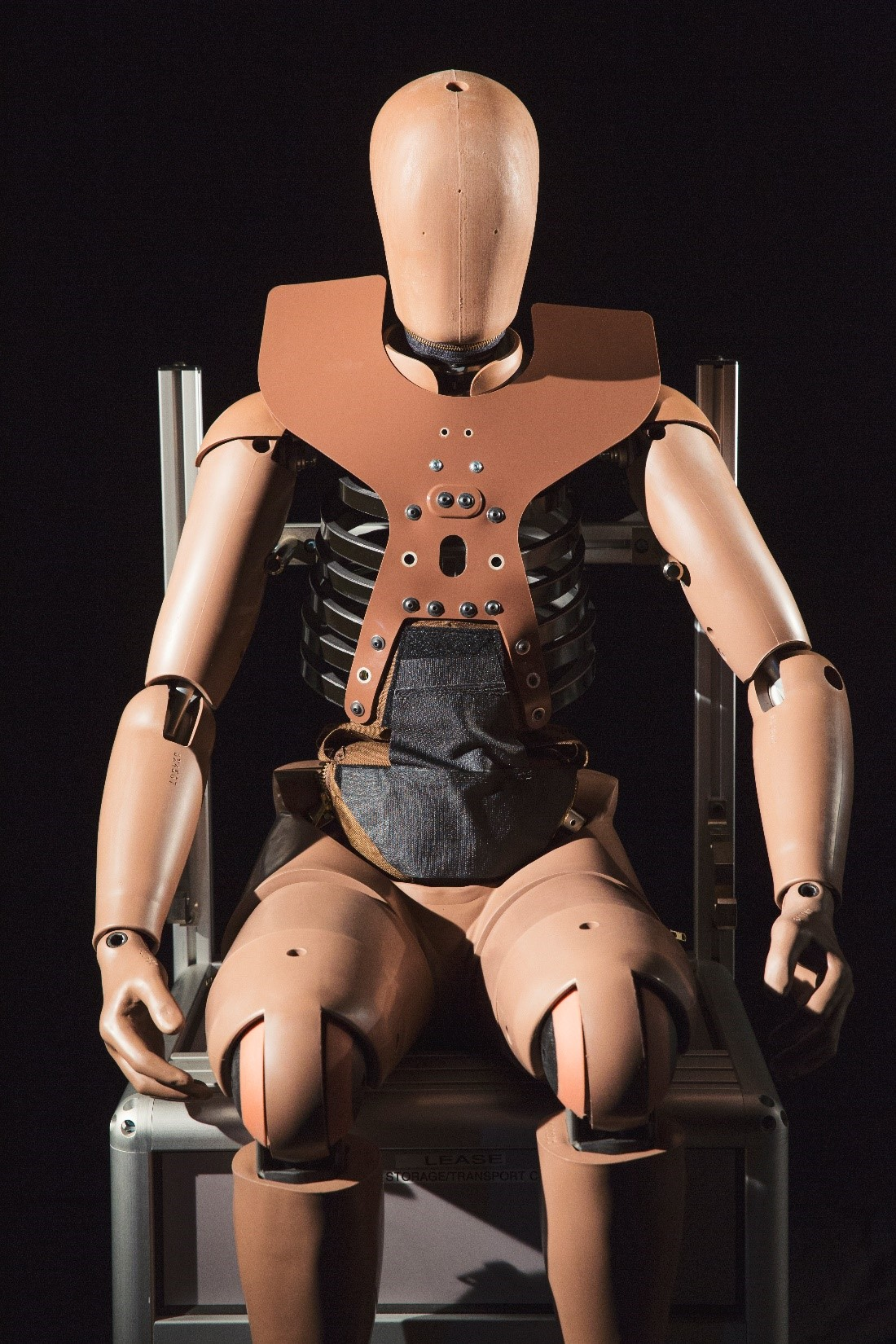
THOR 50 ATD

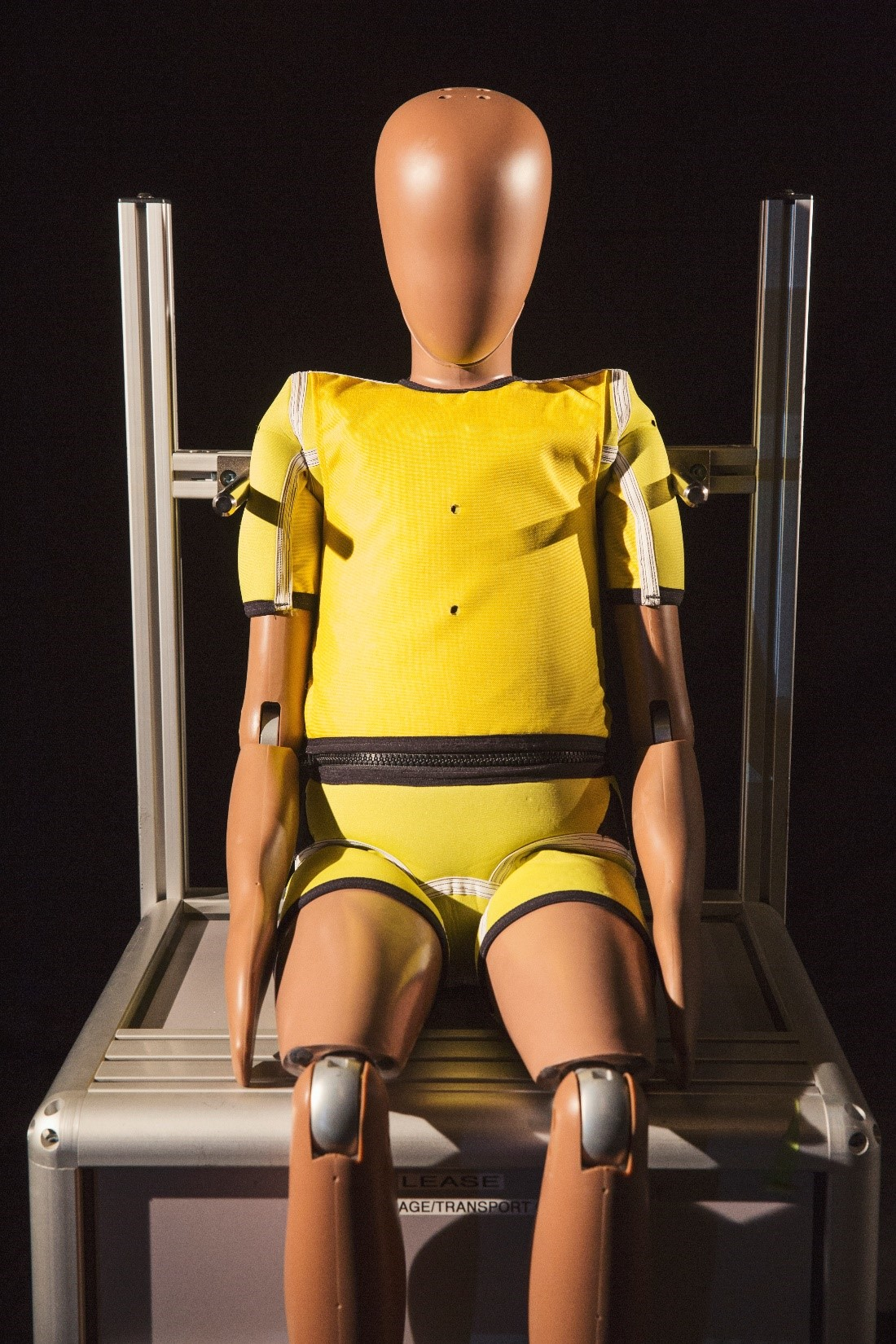
Child ATD - Q10

Humanetics makes a variety of crash test dummies, ranging from newborn infants and adults to the obese and the elderly. The company works with agencies and industry groups such as NHTSA, Euro NCAP, and the University of Michigan's International Center for Automotive Medicine (ICAM) to design crash test dummies that reflect changing worldwide demographics. The dummy product line-up includes a range of frontal, side and rear impact and child crash test dummies.

The company's most biologically accurate model is THOR (Test device for Human Occupant Restraint). Humanetics developed THOR with funding from the National Highway Traffic Safety Administration (NHTSA). The dummy has 57 sensors that analyze 140 factors such as chest compression, sternum acceleration, and skull shifting. Humanetics produces a THOR-50M representing a 50th percentile adult male, a THOR-5F representing a 5th percentile female, and a THOR-AV 50M and THOR-AV 5F for autonomous vehicle safety testing.

The company also produces the Hybrid III, the established standard for a front-end test crash.

Humanetics 3D prints some of its dummies, a cheaper and faster process versus traditional steel-based dummies, with more durable parts. The company uses a micro carbon fiber filled nylon filament from 3D printing company Markforged called Onyx.

The company also develops active safety equipment and facilities targeted for advanced driver-assistance systems (ADAS) and autonomous cars. This includes UFO Nano, an Ultra Flat Overrunnable (UFO) robot platform used to mimic pedestrian behavior.

Other related products include ATD calibration software, and a range of instrumentation including load cells, accelerometers, potentiometers and IR-TRACCs (Infra-Red Telescoping Rod for the Assessment of Chest Compression).

The company holds numerous patents for the assembly of ATDs, along with systems to measure their performance in simulated crashes.

Humanetics' Avalution GmbH business unit specializes in 3D body scanning, and owns the largest international database of human body dimensions and shapes.

Humanetics' Human Solutions GmbH business unit develops Ramsis software, considered the industry standard for ergonomic design. Using the Avalution database, Ramsis allows users to create virtual vehicle interiors and custom 3D avatars to simulate vehicle occupants, for safety and ergonomic testing and development.

== Other Humanetics Group divisions ==
Humanetics includes multiple business units:

- Avalution GmbH, a 3D human body scanning firm
- Human Solutions GmbH, a design firm that provides CAD models of humans for prototype testing
- Fibercore, a British manufacturer of specialty optical fibers
- HITEC Sensors, a manufacturer of specialized strain gage applications
- OpTek Systems, a manufacturer of laser processing equipment
- mg-sensor GmbH, specialists in the design and development of high-quality sensors, data acquisition and calibration services
- ATD-LabTech GmbH, an independent supplier of testing systems, as well as a service and consulting provider

== Operations ==
Since 2018, Humanetics Group and its subsidiaries have been owned by private equity firm Bridgepoint Capital. Humanetics has two plants in the United States: one at its headquarters in Farmington Hills, Michigan, where it focuses on instrumentation, and another in Huron, Ohio. The company also has facilities worldwide including The Netherlands; Heidelberg, Germany; Graz and Linz, Austria; Shanghai, China; Bangalore, India; and Tokyo and Nagoya, Japan.

Humanetics Group's President and Chief Executive Officer is Christopher O’Connor.
