= Deer–vehicle collisions =

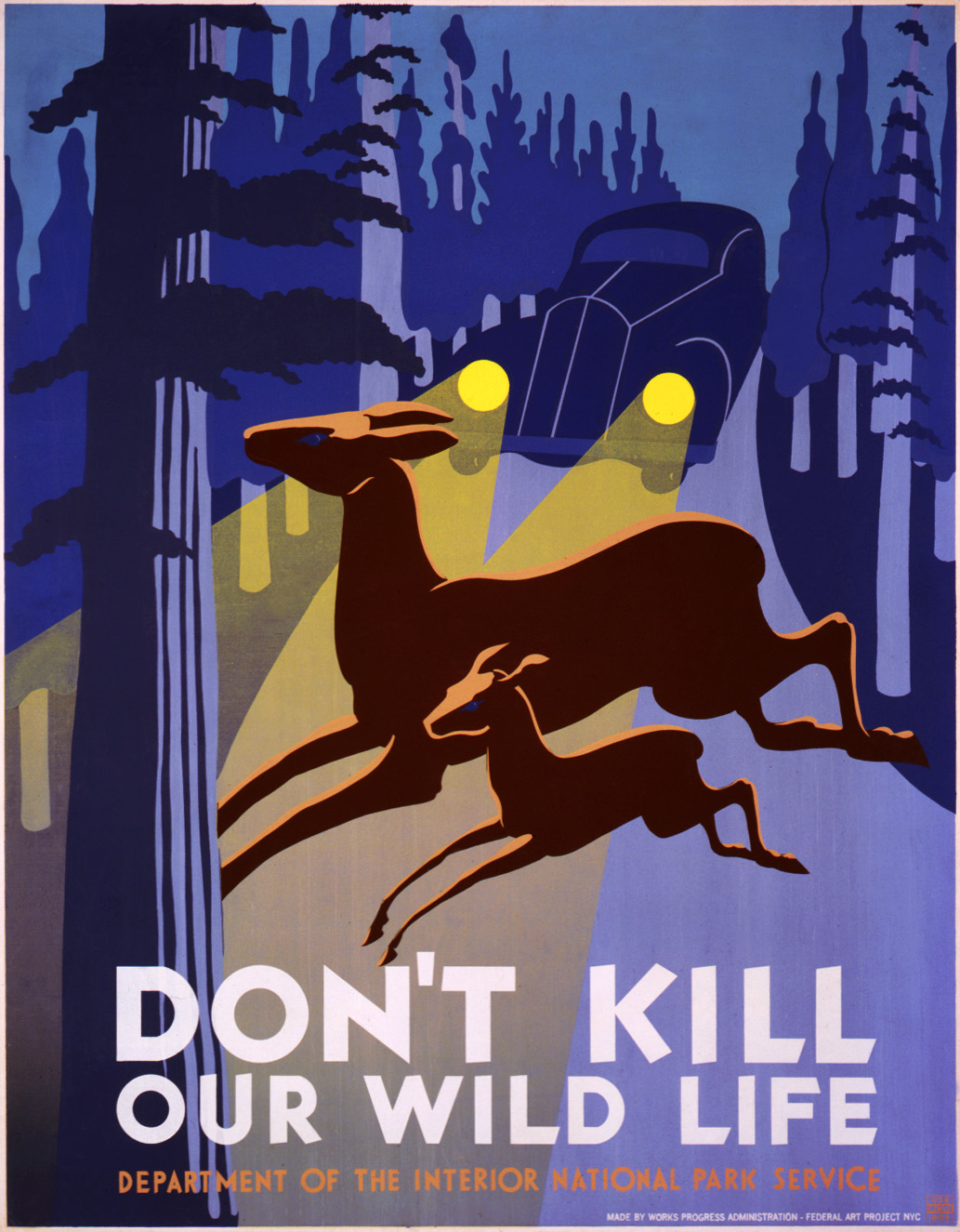
Early 20th century poster from the United States Park Service concerning wildlife-vehicle collisions

A deer–vehicle collision (DVC) occurs when one or more deer and a human-operated vehicle collide on a roadway. It can result in deer fatality, property damage, and human injury or death. The number of accidents, injuries, and fatalities varies from year to year and region. Each year in the United States, deer–vehicle collisions resulted in at least 59,000 human injuries and 440 human fatalities.

In 2000, of the 6.1 million lightweight motor vehicle collisions in the US, 1 million involved animal-vehicle collisions. Deer–vehicle collisions lead to about $1.1 billion in property damage every year. State and federal governments, insurance companies, and drivers spend an additional $3 billion in an effort to reduce and manage the increasing number of deer-vehicle collisions.

In Canada during 2000, there were nearly 29,000 animal-vehicle collisions resulting in property damage only, an additional 1,887 involving non-fatal injuries, and 23 fatal collisions.

In Germany, over 220,000 traffic collisions occur annually involving deer, over 1000 of which lead to human injuries and around 20 to human fatalities.

== History ==
In North America in the 16th century, deer populations began to drop with the arrival of Europeans. The harvesting of deer for their hides and their meat led to their near-extinction. During this same period, wolves, a primary predator of deer, were targeted for eradication as wolves would eat livestock. By about 1960, wolves in the United States were almost completely wiped out.

Deer–vehicle collisions have occurred since roadways have been built in close and direct proximity to direct habitat, also known as deer habitat fragmentation. White-tailed deer, the most common deer involved in deer-vehicle collisions, have steadily increased in numbers since 1900. As of 2023, it is estimated that 36 million deer populate the United States. The actual number of animals killed in deer-vehicle collisions is not known because no such database exists. In a 1981 study, it was concluded that "large animals", which included deer, accounted for 26% of animals killed each year in collisions with vehicles on interstates and country roads.

The expansion of roadways, habitat destruction, and consequent habitat fragmentation in the US have increased the number of deer-vehicle collisions.

In the United States, the state with the highest number of deer-vehicle collisions is Pennsylvania, with an estimated 115,000 collisions in 2013 causing $400 million in damage. West Virginia is the state with the highest risk that a motorist will hit a deer whilst driving.

== Contributing factors ==
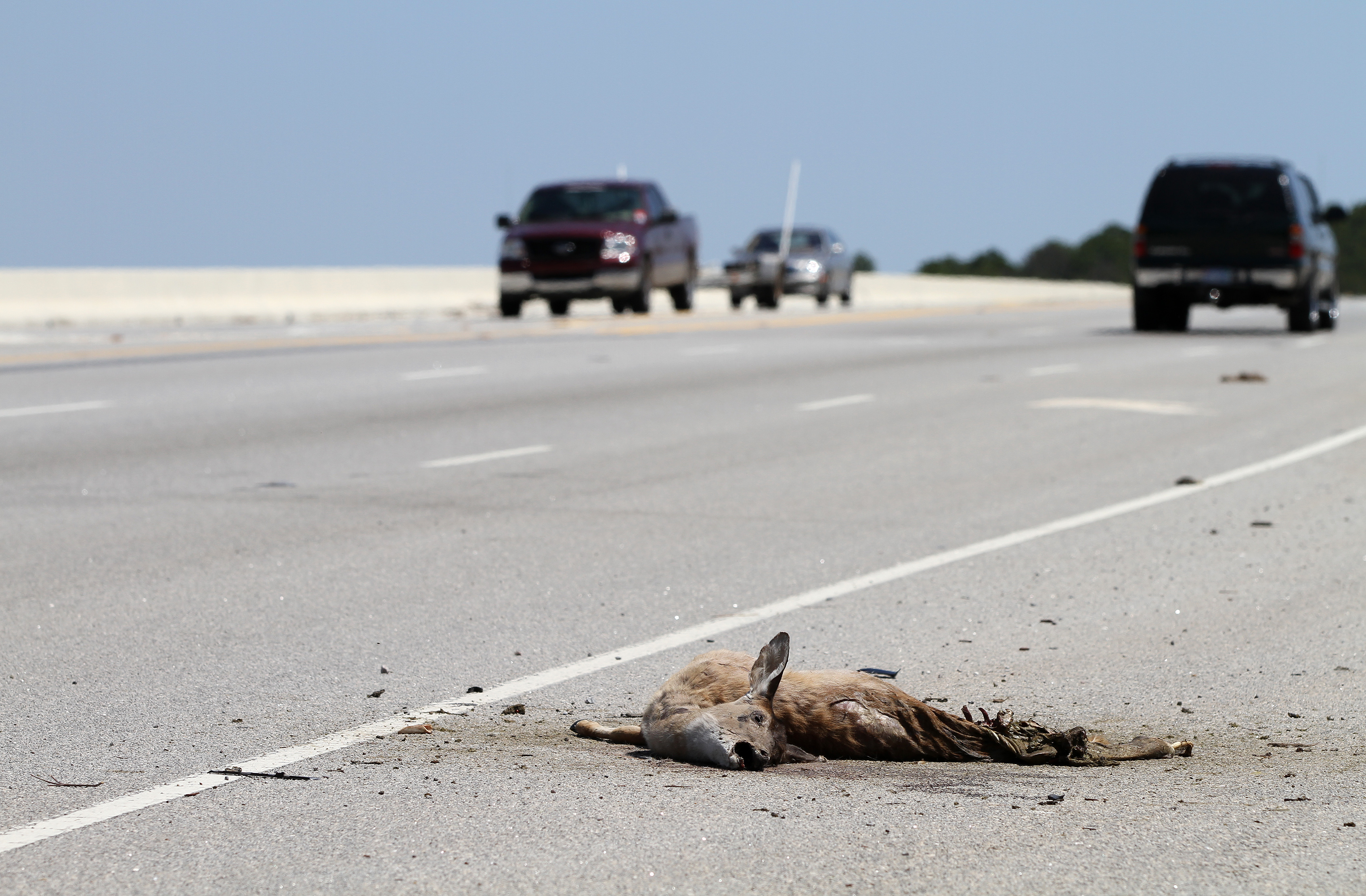
Roadkilled deer on the Okatie Highway, South Carolina, US

The contributing factors of deer-vehicle collisions have been contested among studies and statistics. Many factors are yet to be identified or understood. At this point the most probable factor is the proximity of roadways to deer-populated forestry. Significant factors also include: urban population and deer density. Also, studies have shown that, nationally, most deer vehicle collisions occur between May and November because of deer mating season and foraging before the winter months.

=== Wolf and deer populations ===
The deer population as of 2020 is approximately 35 million. According to a study done by Jennifer Raynor, a natural-resource economist at Wesleyan University, wolves in the US state of Wisconsin were responsible for a 25% reduction in deer-vehicle collisions after being reintroduced into the environment there.

=== Habitat fragmentation ===
Habitat fragmentation occurs when human technology encroaches upon the natural habitats of animals. As humans live in closer proximity to other animals, they are more likely to encounter one another. The most common type of habitat fragmentation across the United States is roadways and highways in forests and other deer-inhabited areas. Because highways are isolated points of fragmentation, deer wander about them freely because they see little to stay away from. Roadways and highways located in sparsely populated areas are usually built along rivers and lakes of mountains and plains. These areas attract deer because they render safe havens and excellent foraging. Roadways and highways within densely populated deer habitat lead to more prevalent deer-vehicle collisions.

=== Time ===
A contributing factor to deer-vehicle collisions is the time of day at which motorists travel through deer habitation. During the daytime, motorists can more easily see and avoid hitting deer. At night, most especially during the dusk and dawn hours, deer are much harder to see, which increases the chance of collision.

== See also ==
- Magnus Gens
- Moose test
- Moose–vehicle collisions
- Roadkill
- Rumble strips
