= Crash Test Danny =

UK educational science sketch television series

Crash Test Danny was a series of 13 educational science sketch television shows for the Discovery Kids channel in the UK.

Danny, played by Ben Langley, is a crash test dummy who goes the extra mile to put the fizz into physics. He is both motivated and hindered by the Professor, played by Gary Carpenter (who also co-wrote the program).

The shows were directed by Justin Rhodes, narrated by Jon Holmes, and series produced by Mark Robson at Initial Television.
