= The Incredible Crash Dummies =

Toy line

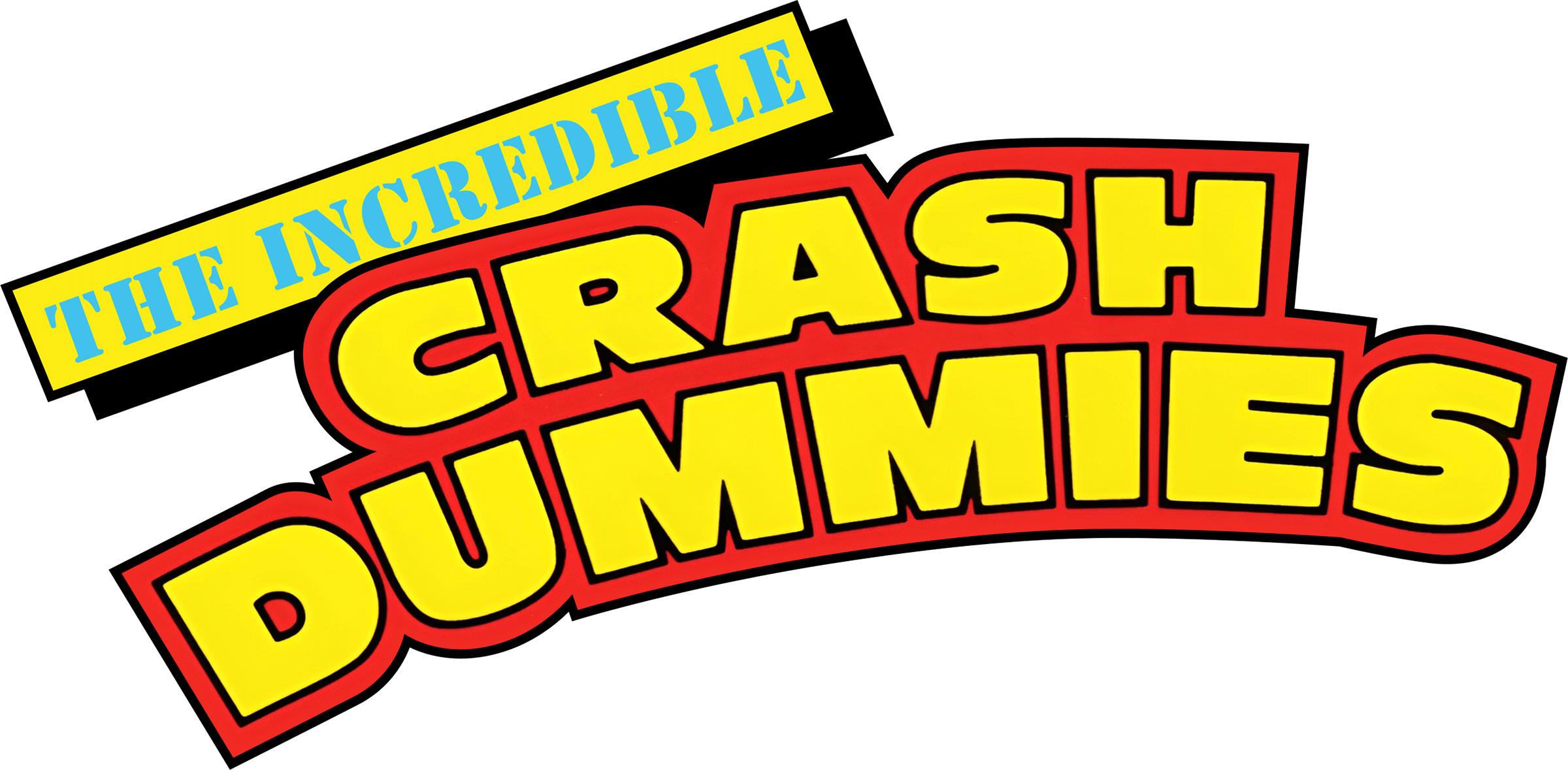
- Title screen of the original Super NES video game
- Created by: David McDonald; Jim Byrne
- Years: 1993–2005

Print publications
- Comics: The Incredible Crash Dummies (Harvey, 1993)

Films and television
- Television series: Crash Dummies (2004–05)
- Television film(s): The Incredible Crash Dummies (1993)

Games
- Video game(s): The Incredible Crash Dummies (1993)
- Action figures: 1993–94

The Incredible Crash Dummies is a media franchise. The line of action figures was designed by David McDonald and Jim Byrne, styled after the eponymous crash test dummy popularized in a public service advertising campaign of the late 1980s, to educate people on the safety of wearing seat belts.

== Toys ==
The figures were first released by Tyco Toys in the early 1990s and discontinued in 1994. From 2004 on, a new series of animated shorts involving the crash dummies was produced and the action figures subsequently revived under the Hot Wheels brand, another subdivision of Mattel.

The Crash Dummies are anthropomorphic action figures modeled after the mannequins used in automobile collision simulations. Each one generally has two "impact buttons" on their torsos that, when pushed, will spring their limbs from their bodies. A set of vehicles was also released which could then be used to simulate car crashes.

== Related media ==
=== Television ===
In 1993, a half-hour television special called The Incredible Crash Dummies was produced. It was aired on Fox Kids on May 1, 1993. The animated short was entirely composed of computer generated imagery and centered on the adventures of Slick and Spin. A fellow Dummy named Ted has been chosen to use a new, indestructible torso module (Torso-9000), but his head is mixed up with an evil dummy's head, leading to the birth of Junkman. Slick and Spin try to free the kidnapped Dr. Zub from Junkman before the villain can extract the knowledge of how to mass-produce the torso. The special was later released on video and sold with the "Ted" action figure from the special as well as a second edition recolored Junkman.

In 2004, a series of "Crash Dummies" animated shorts were commissioned for the Fox network and produced by 4Kids Entertainment. About a year later after it first aired, the graphics of the shorts were changed. The characters looked slightly darker, while the frame rate of the shorts were slightly slower. In this series, the dummies were named Crash, Splice, Crunch, and Gyro. In the fall of 2005, they were replaced by Teenage Mutant Ninja Turtles shorts.

=== Video games ===
A video game also called The Incredible Crash Dummies was developed by Gray Matter Inc. and published by LJN, Ltd. in 1993 for the Nintendo Entertainment System and Super NES. The game was ported to numerous systems including the Genesis and Amiga. It was awarded Strangest License of 1992 by Electronic Gaming Monthly.

The game received generally negative reviews, with critics commenting that the controls are poor and the novelty factor quickly wears out.

=== Comics ===
A series of comics involving the Crash Dummies in pro-tek suits was also produced by Harvey Comics in November 1993.

A set of three magazine sized comics were released by Citgo in 1992 featuring the dummies in their original suits. Scattered throughout the comics are various puzzles and games to complete.
