= Samuel W. Alderson =

American inventor

- Samuel W. Alderson
- Born: October 21, 1914; Cleveland, Ohio, U.S.
- Died: February 11, 2005 (aged 90); Marina Del Rey, California, U.S.
- Education: University of California, Berkeley
- Engineering career
- Projects: crash test dummy

Samuel W. Alderson (October 21, 1914 – February 11, 2005) was an American inventor best known for his development of the crash test dummy, a device that, during the last half of the twentieth century, was widely used by automobile manufacturers to test the reliability of automobile seat belts and other safety protocols.

== Biography ==
Alderson was born in Cleveland, Ohio but was raised in southern California as a toddler where his Romanian-immigrant father ran a custom sheet-metal and sign shop. He graduated from high school at the age of 15 and went on to intermittently study at Reed College, Caltech, Columbia and UC Berkeley. He frequently interrupted his education to help out with the family sheet-metal business. He completed his formal education at the University of California, Berkeley, under the tutelage of J. Robert Oppenheimer and Ernest O. Lawrence, but did not complete his doctoral dissertation. He was also captain of the Varsity water polo team, winning many awards and receiving many accolades.

In 1952, he began his own company, Alderson Research Laboratories, and quickly won a contract to create an anthropometric dummy for use in testing aircraft ejection seats. At about the same time, automobile manufacturers were being challenged to produce safer vehicles, and to do so without relying on live volunteers or human cadavers.

In 1966, the National Traffic and Motor Vehicle Safety Act was passed, which together with Ralph Nader's book, Unsafe at Any Speed put the search for an anatomically faithful test dummy into high gear. With this as a goal, Alderson produced the V.I.P., a dummy designed to mimic an average male's acceleration and weight properties, and to reproduce the effects of impact like a real person. His work went on to see the creation of the Hybrid family of test dummies, which as of the beginning of the 21st century are the de facto standards for testing.

Alderson also worked for the United States military. During World War II, he helped develop an optical coating to improve the vision of submarine periscopes, and worked on depth charge and missile guidance technology. He also helped create dummies, known as "medical phantoms", that reacted to radiation, and synthetic wounds, used in emergency training simulations, which behaved like real wounds. Based on that experience, he formed another company that he managed until shortly before his death, Radiology Support Devices, to supply the healthcare industry. Later on, he built dummies to test the Apollo nose cone's water landing capability.

Alderson died at his home in Marina Del Rey, California, due to complications from myelofibrosis. Alderson was widowed once and divorced three times. In addition to his son Jeremy, he is survived by a sister, another son, and four grandchildren.
