= Defense Travel System =

U.S. Department of Defense software application

The Defense Travel System (DTS) is a software application used by the U.S. Department of Defense which allows defense travelers to manage their commercial travel in accordance with the government's Joint Travel Regulations.

Travelers can create authorizations — temporary duty travel (TDY) travel orders, prepare travel reservations, receive approvals, generate travel vouchers, and receive a split reimbursement between their bank accounts and the Government Travel Charge Card (GTCC) vendor.

DTS operates at over 9,500 total sites worldwide, and on average, DTS processes more than 25,000 transactions while approximately 100,000 unique users access it on a daily basis. Defense Manpower Data Center (DMDC) Program Management Office DTS (PMO-DTS) has the program oversight (acquisition, technical, operation and maintenance) oversight of DTS while the Defense Travel Management Office (DTMO) has functional oversight.

== Customer support ==
- Travel Assistance Center (TAC) provides travel assistance to the Defense travel community before, during, and after official travel. The staff provide advice and assistance on the DTS, DoD travel card, travel policy, commercial travel services and programs, and allowances and entitlements.
- TraX allows users to submit a help desk ticket and track the progress of open tickets.

== Training resources ==
The Defense Travel Management Office (DTMO) provides training resources for using DTS:

- Web-based training
- Distance learning
- Courseware
- Enterprise Web-based Training System (EWTS)
- Reference materials
