= Diversified Technical Systems =

Data Technology Systems manufacturer in America

DTS, Diversified Technical Systems

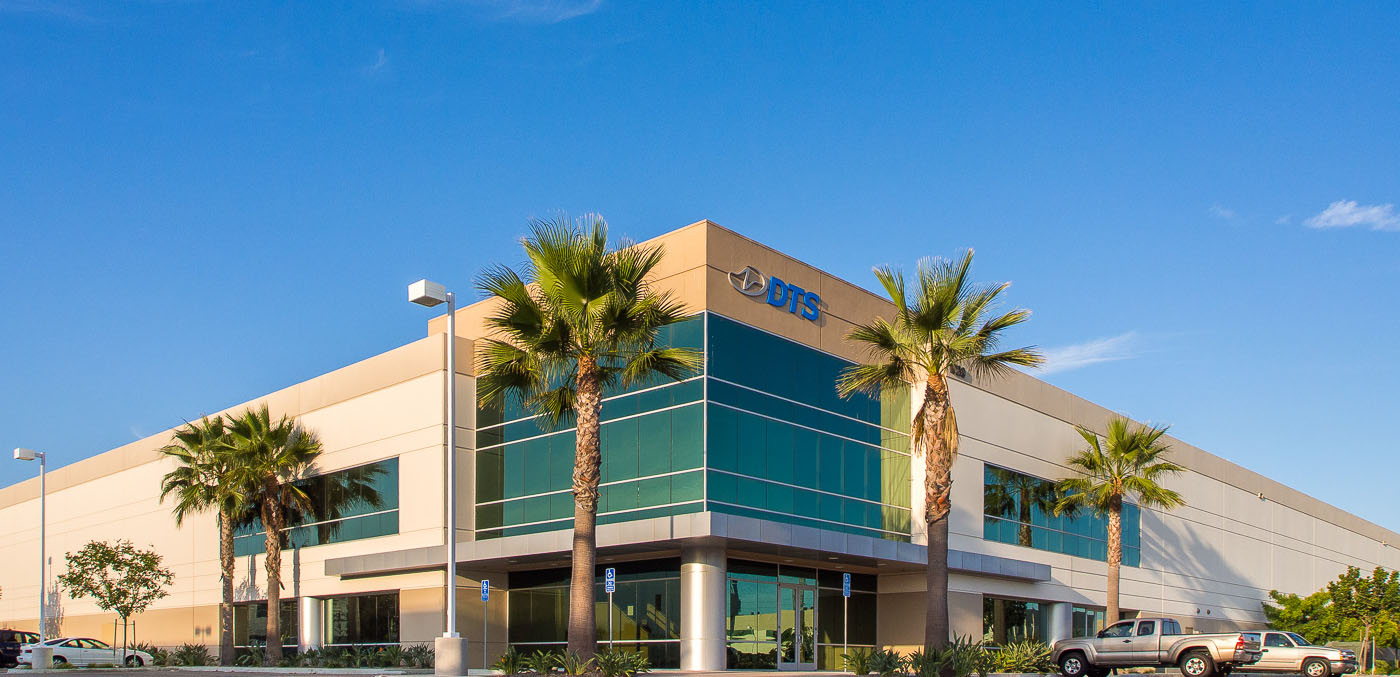
- DTS Headquarters, Seal Beach, CA
- Industry: Technology
- Founded: 1990; 35 years ago
- Founders: Mike Beckage, Steve Pruitt, Tim Kippen
- Headquarters: Seal Beach, California, United States
- Area served: Worldwide
- Products: Miniature Data Acquisition Systems, Sensors, Anthropomorphic Test Devices (ATDs) and related products
- Owner: Vishay Precision Group, Inc. (NYSE: VPG)
- Website: dtsweb.com

DTS (Diversified Technical Systems) is an American manufacturer of miniature, high-shock rated, data acquisition systems and sensors for product and safety testing in extreme environments. DTS products, made in the U.S., are used in multiple industries including automotive, aerospace, military and defense, industrial, and sports and injury biomechanics. DTS was founded in 1990 by three crash test engineers: Mike Beckage, Steve Pruitt, and Tim Kippen. The company is headquartered in Seal Beach, California, with technical centers in Michigan, Europe, Japan, China, Korea, and Asia Pacific.

== History ==
DTS founded their Roller Coaster Testing Services (RSTE) in 1994 and in 1996 became an S-Corporation and introduced the production of a modular DAS system, developed for KARCO Engineering (acquired by Applus+ IDIADA). Two years later they introduced their first major DAS product line TDAS PRO.

One year later in 1999, DTS won the Worldwide Side Impact Dummy contract to develop in-dummy DAS. DTS developed and introduced the first centralized in-dummy DAS solution in 2000 and 2007' expanded beyond the automotive crash market. They also fielded their first helmet sensors in Iraq and Afghanistan with the U.S. Army and U.S. Marine Corps. In the same year, DTS introduced new technology in their product line of SLICE, TSR, and angular rate sensors, and also proposed Worldwide Side Impact Dummy WorldSID with SLICE in-dummy DAS.

DTS was awarded its first Small Business Innovation Research Award (SBIR) in 2006 from the Department of Defense to develop a small, self-powered Impact Event Recorder (IER) that could be easily added to head protective equipment.

Inc. Magazine named DTS one of the fastest-growing private companies in the U.S. in 2009. DTS SLICE (miniature modular DAS) was used to collect data for a new world record when Professor Splash dives from 35' 9" into 12" of water and one year later DTS grew to 50 employees with 6 global offices and 350+ customers. At the end of 2010 the first production version units of HEADS, Headborne Energy Analysis and Diagnostic Systems were delivered, a helmet-mounted shock recorder that collects field data to help soldiers determine if they should seek immediate attention for mild traumatic brain injury. In 2011 the first HEADS production lot shipped and the first units were fielded by the U.S. Army.

In 2012 NHTSA/Dept. of Transportation selected DTS’ TDAS G5 for 640 channels in new Crash Barrier Load Walls. They introduced the new flexible force sensor and the U.S. Army named DTS helmet sensor (HEADS) one of “The greatest inventions of 2011.” DTS DAS was utilized in the world's biggest remote-controlled plane crash featured on The Discovery Channel "Curiosity." On CBS This Morning and CBS Nightline DTS DAS was featured in “Smart Dummies” about General Motors and “Brace for Impact.” and delivered the 40,000th helmet recorder to the U.S. Army. I

In 2013 DTS relocated to corporate headquarters in Seal Beach, California, with over 80 employees and Technical Centers in North America, Europe & Asia-Pacific. In the following year, 2015, DTS is awarded the U.S. Army contract to engineer and deliver a working prototype of WIAMan, the first blast test dummy, and in 2014 DTS delivered 18,000 additional helmet sensors to the U.S. Army.

The WIAMan program advanced and DTS delivered the technical data package (TDP) to the Army's WIAMan Engineering Office in 2018.

On June 1, 2021, Diversified Technical Systems (DTS) became part of Vishay Precision Group, Inc. (NYSE: VPG). NASA Artemis 1 launches on November 16 with DTS TSR PRO onboard to gather data during the mission.
