= The Incredible Crash Dummies (video game) =

1992 video game

- Developer: Gray Matter: Amiga, Genesis, SNES Gray Matter Game Boy, NES Software Creations Game Gear, Master System Teeny Weeny Games
- Publisher: Acclaim Entertainment (Note: Released under the LJN brand for Nintendo systems, and the Flying Edge brand for Sega systems.)
- Composers: Allister Brimble (Amiga), Geoff Follin (NES, Game Boy), Matt Furniss (Master System, Game Gear)
- Platforms: Amiga, Master System, Mega Drive/Genesis, Super NES, Nintendo Entertainment System, Game Boy, Game Gear
- Release: November 1992: Game Boy; NA: November 1992; PAL: February 19, 1993 Master System; PAL: May 1993 Mega Drive/Genesis; NA/PAL: January 1994 Super NES; PAL: 1993; NA: October 1993; JP: September 30, 1994 NES; PAL: 1993; NA: August 1994 Game Gear; NA: 1992; PAL: May 1993; JP: September 30, 1994
- Genre: Action
- Modes: Single-player, multiplayer

Between 1992 and 1994, Acclaim Entertainment, under various subsidiaries, published three video games named The Incredible Crash Dummies (Note: Japanese: クラッシュ・ダミー スリック坊やの大挑戦, Hepburn: Kurasshu Damī: Surikku Bōya no Daichōsen), based on the line of toys of the same name developed by Tyco Toys.

Software Creations developed two of these. One was on the NES, and another was originally on the Game Boy before being ported by Teeny Weeny Games to Sega's Master System and Game Gear consoles. Gray Matter developed another one that was released for the SNES, Sega Genesis and Amiga. The Nintendo releases were published under LJN, the Sega releases under Flying Edge.

== Gameplay ==
=== Game Boy, Game Gear, Master System ===
Based upon the idea of Slick and Spin trying to save money for a vacation, this version of the game is composed of varying different minigames, including a stunt jump, ski slalom course, and bomb disposal. Score is awarded based on the player's performance, specifically how well they are able to avoid obstacles and prevent crashing into things prematurely.

=== Amiga, Mega Drive/Genesis, Super NES ===
Loosely based upon the 1993 FOX Kids animated TV special, the player controls Slick to rescue Dr. Zub from Junkman. The game is a platforming action game divided into five areas. One of the Junkbots serves as each area's midlevel boss with Junkman as the game's final boss. Rather than taking damage in the traditional sense, Slick will lose a limb when he collides with an enemy or a hazard. If he loses all limbs and takes further damage, his head will fall off, causing him to lose a life. Collecting screwdrivers will reattach a limb.

=== NES ===
The NES version of the game has an original storyline, wherein Slick and Spin must rescue Daryl (erroneously referred to as "Darryl" throughout the instruction manual), Spare Tire, and Bumper from Junkman. Also a platforming action game, the player alternates between Slick and Spin. In this version only, Slick rides a unicycle, which can be pushed back by enemies and stage hazards.

== Reception ==
Reception

Review scores
Publication	Score
Electronic Gaming Monthly	4/10 (SNES)
Famitsu	6/10, 6/10, 5/10, 6/10 (SNES)
Game Players	7/10 (SNES)
GamePro	3.87/5 (GEN) (Note: GamePro gave the Genesis version three 4/5 scores for graphics, control, and fun factor, and a 3.5/5 rating for sound.); 3.12/5 (NES) (Note: GamePro gave the NES version three 3/5 scores for graphics, sound, and control, and 3.5/5 for fun factor.)
Mega Fun	78% (GG/SMS)
Video Games (DE)	48% (SMS)
VideoGames & Computer Entertainment	5/10 (SMD); 4/10 (NES)
Electronic Games	65% (NES)
MegaZone	58% (GEN)
Sega Master Force	84% (SMS)

The game received mixed-to-negative reviews upon release. In May 1993, Game Pro magazine gave the NES version three 3/5 scores for graphics, sound, and control, and 3.5/5 for the fun factor. In August 1993, the German magazine Video Games gave the Master System version a 48% score for the fun factor. In August 1993, the British magazine Sega Force gave the Master System version a 84% score, stating that, the "gameplay is the same as on the Game Gear, things are easier to see, and it's still as tough as the handheld version, though, but criticising the problem of Crash Dummies becoming repetitive, after playing events twice, but overall a great game, you should consider adding to your collection". In October 1993, EGM's Mike Weigand gave the game a 4/10, noting the game's "never appealing idea", and that "this version proves the point", stating that, "this side-scrolling, survive the levels-type game is cute at times", but additionally disapproved "the poor control", and was dissatisfied that the game's "mandatory cheap hits by enemies ruin things". In January 1994, the Australian magazine MegaZone gave the Genesis version a 58% score, noting that it's "[o]bviously intended for younger players, Crash Dummies lacks sophistication, an is not really relevant to serious gamesters." In February 1994, GamePro magazine gave the Genesis version three 4/5 scores for graphics, control, and fun factor, and a 3.5/5 rating for sound. In April 1994, the German magazine Mega Fun gave both the Game Gear and the Master System version a rating of 79% on the fun factor, stating that this game is an absolute prime example of the fact that a module can spread a lot of fun even without elaborate technology. (Note: "Dieses Spiel ist ein absolutes Musterbeispiel dafür, daß ein Modul auch ohne aufwendige Technik eine Menge Laune verbreiten kann.")

== Sources ==
- The Incredible Crash Dummies (NES) instruction manual. LJN. 1993. pp. 1–13.
- The Incredible Crash Dummies (Super NES) instruction manual. LJN. 1993. pp. 1-22.
- Neumayer, Manfred (August 1993). "Video Games - Die ganze Welt der Videospiele" [Video Games - The whole world of video games]. Video Games (in German). No. 21. Future-Verlag (published 1993-08-01). ISSN 0946-0985.
- Wooding, Paul (August 1993). "Sega Master Force - Issue 1 - United Kingdom Magazine - Scans - SMS Power!". Sega Master Force. No. 1. ISSN 0964-2552.
- Saxon, Rampant (1993). "Nintendo Pro Review" (PDF). GamePro. No. 55. ISSN 1042-8658.
- Schneider, Ulf (1994). "Mega Fun - Der totale Videospielespass für alle Systeme" [Mega Fun - The total video game fun for all systems]. Mega Fun (in German). No. 12. Computec. ISSN 0038-0946.
- Viper, Trevor (January 1994). "Crash Dummies" (PDF). Mega Zone. No. 35. Megazone Publications. ISSN 1321-8131.
- Weigand, Mike (October 1993). "Incredible Crash Dummies LJN / Super NES". Electronic Gaming Monthly. Vol. 6, no. 51. ISSN 1058-918X.
- Yates, Laurie (April 1993). "The Incredible Crash Dummies". Electronic Games. Vol. 1, no. 7. ISSN 0730-6687.
