= Swedish National Road and Transport Research Institute =

Research institution in Linköping, Sweden

Statens väg- och transportforskningsinstitut (VTI)
- Logo of VTI
- Type: Public Scientific and Technical Research Establishment
- Purpose: Swedish Institute for Research in Transportation
- Headquarters: Linköping
- Region served: Sweden
- Official language: Swedish
- Staff: 200
- Website: www.vti.se

The Swedish National Road and Transport Research Institute (Swedish: Statens väg- och transportforskningsinstitut, VTI) is a public research institution with focus on transportation in Sweden. The head office is located in Linköping, where most of the operations are located.

== History ==
The Swedish National Road and Transport Research Institute was founded between 1923 and 1925. Since then it has changed names from the National Road Institute in 1934 and then the Swedish National Road and Traffic Research Institute in 1971. It was renamed the Swedish National Road and Transport Research Institute in 1993.

== Sites ==
VTI also has offices in several sites all over Sweden. It has offices in Borlänge and Stockholm where the research is in transport economics and transport policy. Another office is located in Gothenburg with research focusing on vehicle technology and vehicle safety and in Lund with a focus on public transport.

== Transport Forum ==
VTI is the main organizer of 'TransportForum' (Swedish: Transportforum), a large Swedish conference gathering important national and international actors in the field of transportation.

== Gallery ==
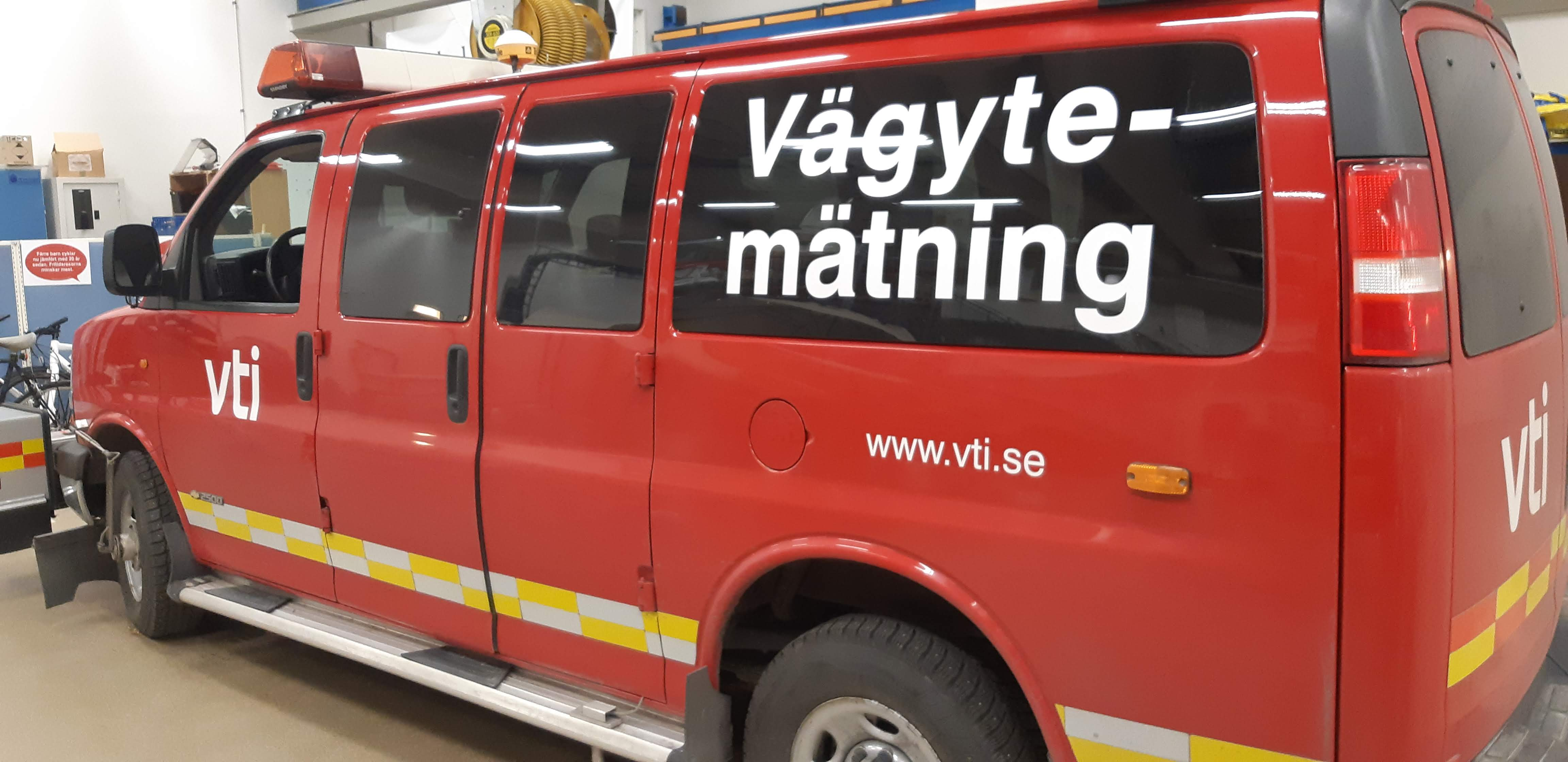
Measurement vehicle

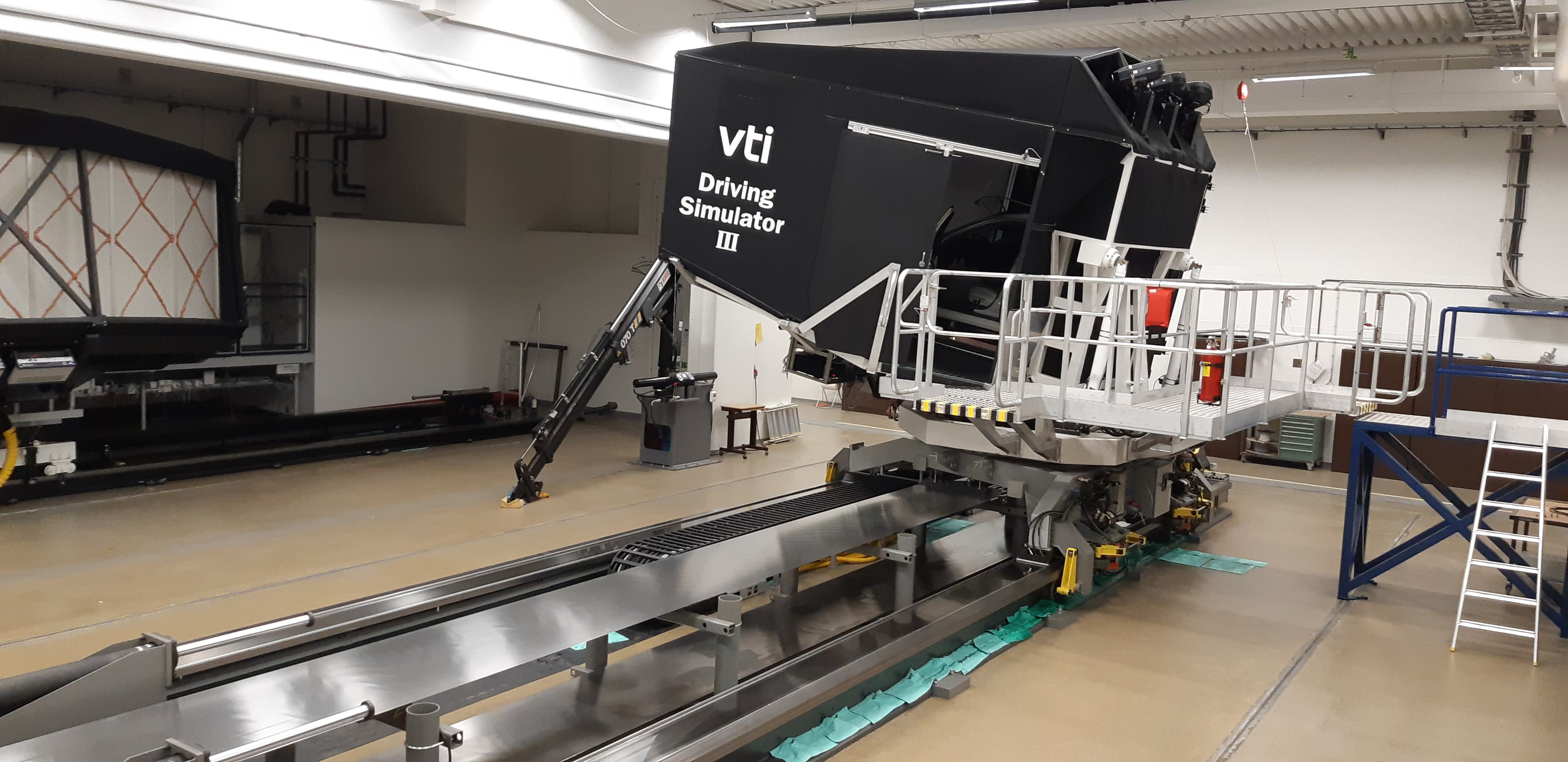
VTI driving simulator III

== See also ==
- Magnus Gens – Swedish engineer who published a notable thesis with the VTI
