= Radioss =

Computer software

Radioss/OpenRadioss
- Developers: Altair Engineering, open source
- Stable release: 2025.1 (Radioss) stable build 20250925 (OpenRadioss) / 2025 (Radioss) 25 september 2025 (stable version of OpenRadios)
- Written in: Fortran
- Operating system: Linux and Microsoft Windows
- Type: FEM software
- License: proprietary (Altair Radioss), GNU AGPL (OpenRadioss)
- Website: www.altair.com/radioss/ www.openradioss.org

Altair Radioss is a multidisciplinary finite element solver developed by Altair Engineering. It includes implicit and explicit time integration schemes for the solution of engineering problems, from linear statics and linear dynamics to non-linear transient dynamics and mechanical systems. The multidisciplinary solver has its main strengths in durability, NVH, crash, safety, manufacturability, and fluid-structure interaction.

Since the 2021 release, Radioss has supported input in the LS-DYNA input format as well as the Radioss 'Block' Format.

OpenRadioss was an open-source version of Radioss under the GNU AGPL license. OpenRadioss shared the capabilities, input and output formats of Altair Radioss. OpenRadioss was released on September the 8th 2022. OpenRadioss used an external library that was partly provided in binary form. This external library contained open-source software like lapack and C++ Mathematical Expression Toolkit Library, as well as free software like md5, zlib, and Altair's library for their h3d extension. In October 2026, Radioss was announced to be integrated into Siemens Simcenter, launching an R&D program, while public access from the GitHub repositories of OpenRadioss was removed.

To continue the development of OpenRadioss after the removal, the Rocky Enterprise Software Foundation created OpenCourant based on the latest known open-source codebase.

== History ==
Radioss originated from the 3D FEA program DYNA3D. DYNA3D was originally developed by Dr. John O. Hallquist at Lawrence Livermore National Laboratory (LLNL) in 1976. DYNA3D was publicly released upon a request of France. After DYNA3D was released, the ESI Group developed Pam-Crash. Some time later, Radioss split from Pam-Crash. This means that the LS-DYNA, Pam-Crash and Radioss all originate from the same base code. Abaqus, Pronto-3D, MSC DYNA, and DYTRAN also originate from DYNA3D.

In September 2022, Altair made the decision to release Radioss also under the open-source GNU AGPL license. This means that Radioss is available both with a commercial license and an open-source license. OpenRadioss allows academia to implement new features in OpenRadioss which later can be ported to Radioss. This means that developments in academia go quicker to a commercial FEA program. Altair also has appointed a director of the OpenRadioss community, Marian Bulla. Besides this, OpenRadioss also has a steering committee with 13 members that include people from industry and academia.

== Disciplines ==
- Linear static analysis
- Non-linear explicit dynamic analysis
- Non-linear implicit quasi-static analysis
- Normal modes analysis for real and complex eigenvalues
- Linear buckling analysis
- Frequency response analysis
- Random response analysis
- Linear transient response analysis
- Linear coupled fluid-structure (acoustic) analysis
- Linear steady-state heat transfer analysis coupled with static analysis
- Explicit Arbitrary Eulerian-Lagrangian (ALE) formulation
- Explicit Computational Fluid Dynamics (CFD)
- Smoothed-particle hydrodynamics (SPH)
- One-step (inverse) and incremental sheet metal stamping analysis

=== Material models ===
Some of the material models available in Radioss are:

- gases
- Metals
- Plastics
- Glass
- Foams
- Fabrics
- Rubbers
- Elastomers
- Polymers
- Honeycombs
- Concrete & soils
- turbulent and/or Viscous fluids
- Detonation products of high explosives
- porous material
- Springs
- Composite materials
- Glues
- User-defined materials

=== Element library ===
Some of the element types available in Radioss are:

- Beams (standard, integrated-beam, trusses, discrete, cables, and welds)
- Discrete Elements (Springs and Dampers)
- Lumped Masses
- Accelerometers
- Sensors
- Seat Belts
- Shells (3, 4-node) (with 3 shell element formulations, namely, Belytschko-Tsay, Batoz-Dhatt and Zeng-Combescure) but also shells for composites or sandwich materials.
- Solids
- SPH Elements
- Arbitrary Lagrangian Eulerian (ALE)
- Thick Shells (8-node)
- void (nothing)

== Difference between Radioss and OpenRadioss ==
Radioss and OpenRadioss were very similar to each other but there are some small differences. The differences are mostly relevant for the automotive industry. These are:

- OpenRadioss did not have the encryption keyword which is used to read-in encrypted commercial crash test dummies.
- OpenRadioss did not have some airbag keywords.
- OpenRadioss did not have the interface with MADYMO, which is also commonly used for commercial crash test dummies.

Other features of Radioss and OpenRadioss were nearly identical. OpenRadioss was the code that developers work actively on. This meant that OpenRadioss commonly was ahead of Radioss in features, but Radioss had more extensive testing by Altair.
