= Pam-Crash =

Pam-Crash is a software package from ESI Group used for crash simulation and the design of occupant safety systems, primarily in the automotive industry. The software enables automotive engineers to simulate the performance of a proposed vehicle design and evaluate the potential for injury to occupants in multiple crash scenarios.

== History ==
The software originated in research aimed at simulating aerospace and nuclear applications. At a meeting organized by VDI (Verein Deutscher Ingenieure) in Stuttgart on May 30, 1978, ESI Group simulated the accidental crash of a military fighter plane into a nuclear power plant German automobile manufacturers took note and tested the applicability of several emerging commercial crash simulation codes, including what would soon become Pam-Crash. This software's predecessor code simulated the frontal impact of a full passenger car structure in an overnight computer run. This was the first successful full-car crash simulation.

Based on Finite element method (FEM), the software enables the modeling of complex geometry by offering different structural and continuum elements: beams, shells, membranes and solids. In a typical crash simulation, shells are used to model thin-walled metal, plastic and composite components. Beams and bars may also be used for stiffening frames, suspensions and special connections. The program offers a large range of linear and nonlinear materials including elastic and visco-plastic and including foam materials and multi-layers composites up to damage and failure models. It was used in the first numerical simulation of a full vehicle rollover by BMW AG (Bayerische Motoren Werke AG). The program provided accurate determination of the structural deformations while the computationally economical rigid body simulation was used during the relatively unimportant deformation and free-flight phases of the simulation.

PAM-CRASH is used on High Performance Computers including massively parallel systems. One of the most time-critical aspects of parallel simulation is the contact handling. Results with a 128-processor computer demonstrated that a contact search algorithm leads to a better scalability. Engineers utilize crash simulation not only to determine the end result of the crash but also to view the step by step time history. Observing factors such as how the bumper is folded in the impact and what is the effect of rib thickness on body deformation in the initial stages of the simulation gives insights that improve crashworthiness of the design.

Desktop Engineering magazine, in its review of ESI Group’s Virtual Performance Solution, which includes this software, said: “You work across multiple analysis domains with a single core model—not different models for every load case. This streamlines your workflow, saving time and money by reducing the number of individual solvers you have to deploy and all that model re-creation business.”

== Applications ==
Pam-Crash was used to design a steel floor pan structure to meet torsion and bending stiffness requirements while reducing its weight by 50% and the number of parts by 70%.

In a different application, the software was dynamically coupled to the occupant safety program MADYMO. The study investigated the interaction of a Hybrid III crash dummy and a passive restraint system of an airbag and kneebolster in a frontal impact situation. Good agreement with experimental data was obtained.

Researchers at the University of North Carolina and Mississippi State University simulated crash scenarios on a Chrysler Neon passenger vehicle using this program and LS-DYNA, another crash simulation code. The test data and simulation results correlated very well with only minor discrepancies in terms of overall impact deformation, component failure modes and velocity and acceleration at various locations on the vehicle.

The software was used to evaluate safety issues at the Beryl Bravo offshore platform in the North Sea operated by ExxonMobil. It was used to perform numerical simulations of the dynamic response of the structure subjected to explosion scenarios. The program's computational models agreed with experimental results and were used to guide the process of designing new blast walls.

The program is used by automobile manufacturers to improve their rankings in New Car Assessment Programs (NCAPs) used to assess the safety performance of competing automobile models. These programs include the Euro NCAP and Japan NCAP as well as a similar rating system provided by the National Highway Traffic Safety Administration (NHTSA).
