= Crumple zone =

Structural feature used in vehicles

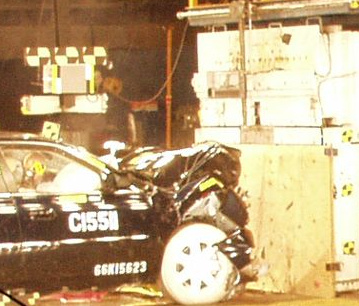
A crash test illustrates how a crumple zone absorbs energy from an impact.

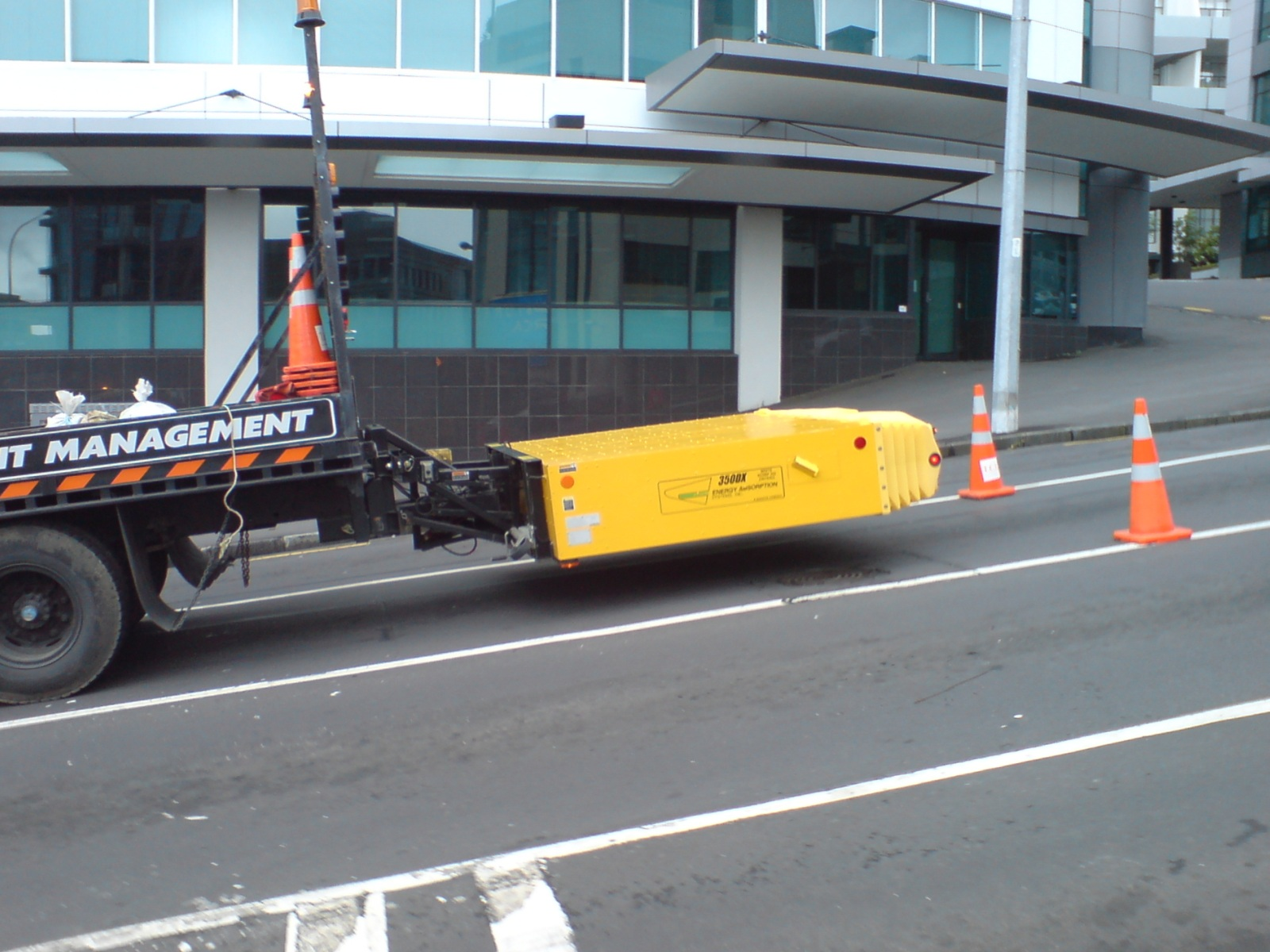
Road Maintenance Truck Impact Attenuator, Auckland, New Zealand

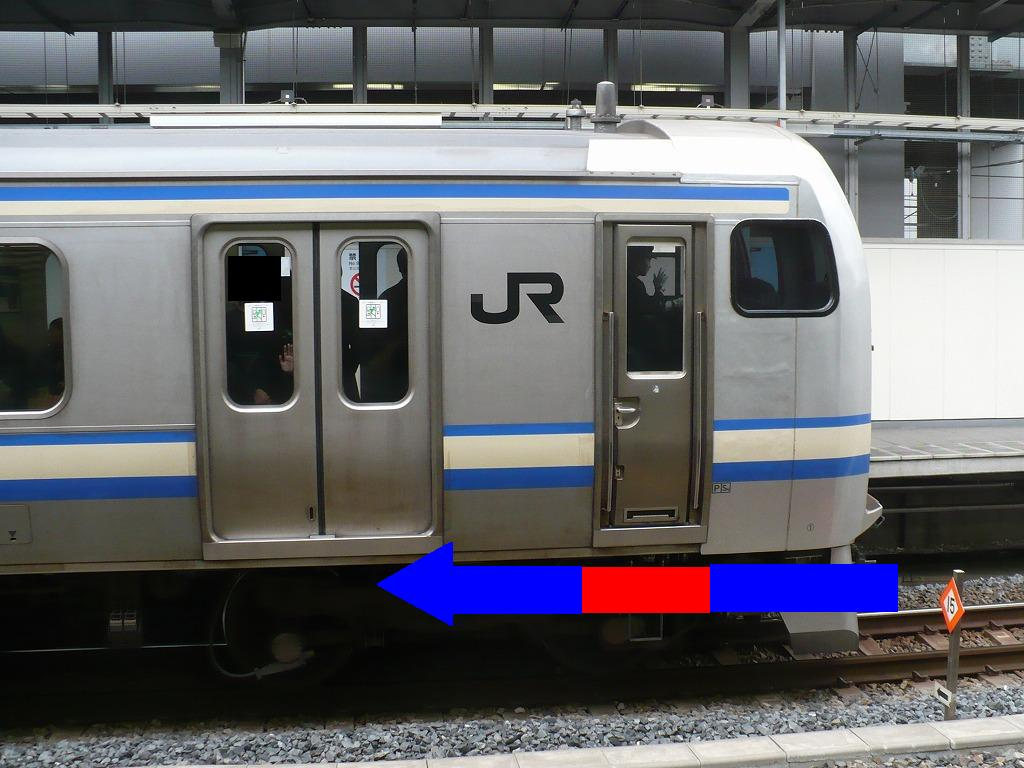
Extent of the crumple zones (blue) and the driver's safety cell (red) of an E217 series train

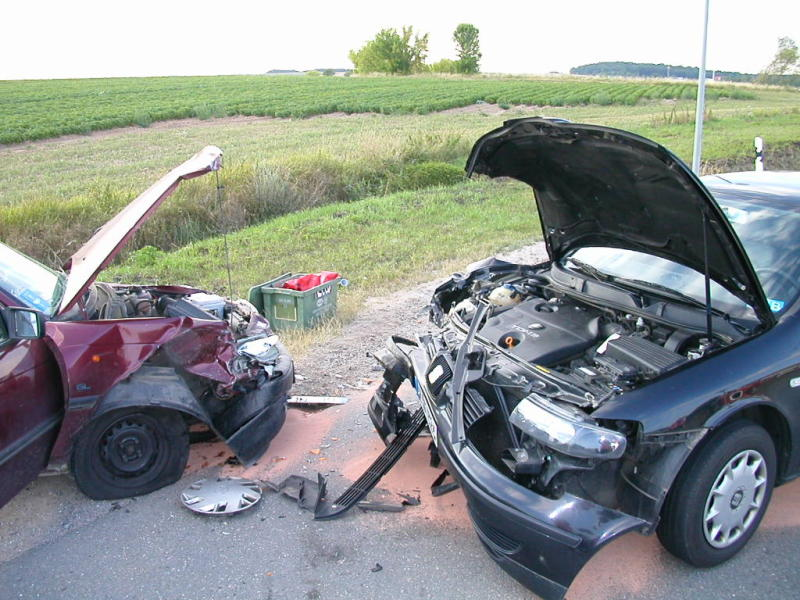
The crumple zone on the front of these cars absorbed the impact of an offset head-on collision.

Crumple zones, crush zones or crash zones are a structural safety feature used in vehicles, mainly in automobiles, to increase the time over which a change in velocity (and consequently momentum) occurs from the impact during a collision by a controlled deformation; in recent years, it is also incorporated into trains and railcars.

Crumple zones are designed to increase the time over which the total force from the change in momentum is applied to an occupant, as the average force applied to the occupants is inversely related to the time over which it is applied. The physics involved can be expressed by the equation:

$$F_\text{avg}\Delta t = m\Delta v$$

where $F$ is the force, $t$ is the time, $m$ is the mass, and $v$ is the velocity of the body.

Typically, crumple zones are located in the front part of the vehicle, to absorb the impact of a head-on collision, but they may be found on other parts of the vehicle as well. According to a British Motor Insurance Repair Research Centre study of where on the vehicle impact damage occurs, 65% were front impacts, 25% rear impacts, 5% left-side, and 5% right-side. Some racing cars use aluminium, composite/carbon fibre honeycomb, or energy absorbing foam to form an impact attenuator that dissipates crash energy using a much smaller volume and lower weight than road car crumple zones. Impact attenuators have also been introduced on highway maintenance vehicles in some countries.

On September 10, 2009, the ABC News programs Good Morning America and World News showed a U.S. Insurance Institute for Highway Safety crash test of a 2009 Chevrolet Malibu in an offset head-on collision with a 1959 Chevrolet Bel Air sedan. It dramatically demonstrated the effectiveness of modern car safety design over 1950s design, particularly of rigid passenger safety cells and crumple zones.

== Early development history ==
The crumple zone concept was originally invented and patented by the Austrian Mercedes-Benz engineer Béla Barényi in 1937 before he worked for Mercedes-Benz and in a more developed form in 1952. The 1953 Mercedes-Benz "Ponton" was a partial implementation of his ideas, by having a strong deep platform to form a partial safety cell, patented in 1941.

The Mercedes-Benz patent number 854157, granted in 1952, describes the decisive feature of passive safety. Barényi questioned the opinion that had prevailed until then that a safe car had to be rigid. He divided the car body into three sections: the rigid non-deforming passenger compartment and the crumple zones in the front and the rear.

The first Mercedes-Benz carbody developed using the patent was the 1959 Mercedes W111 "tail fin" saloon. The safety cell and crumple zones were achieved primarily by the design of the longitudinal members: these were straight in the centre of the vehicle and formed a rigid safety cage with the body panels, the front and rear supports were curved so that they deformed in the event of an accident, absorbing part of the collision energy.

A more recent development for these curved longitudinal members is to be weakened by vertical and lateral ribs to form telescoping "crash can" or "crush tube" deformation structures.

== Function ==
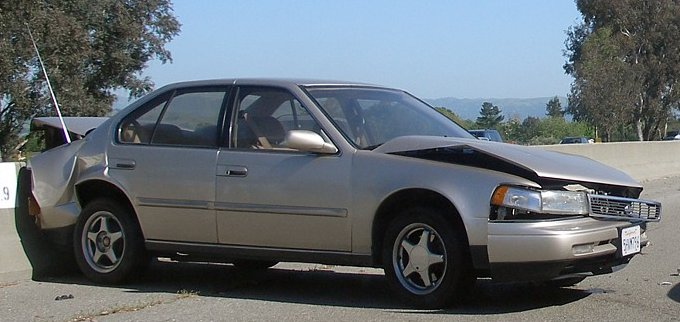
Activated rear crumple zone

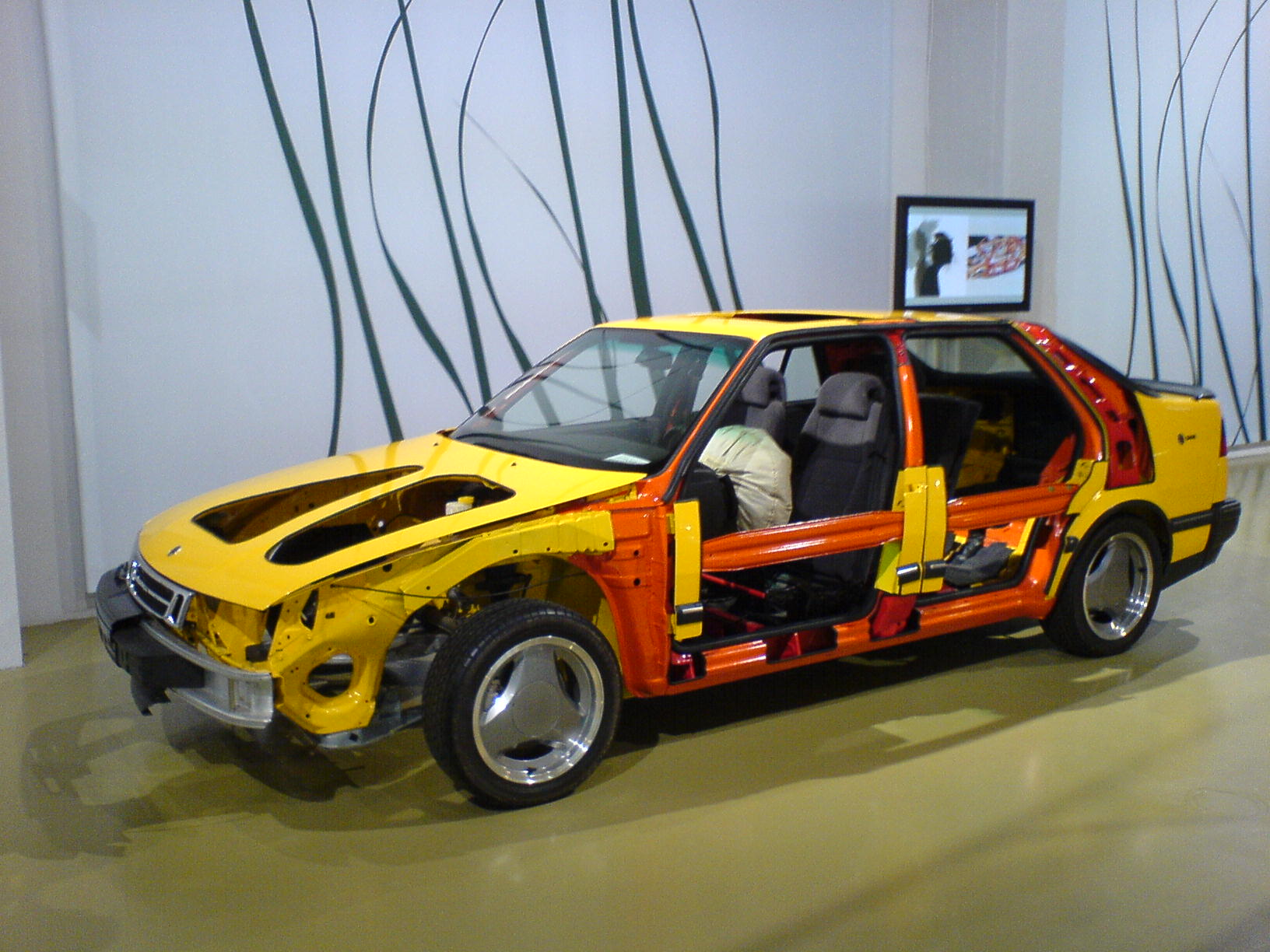
Cross section to show the different strength of the metal in a Saab 9000. The safety cell is in stronger metal (red) compared to the crumple zones (yellow).

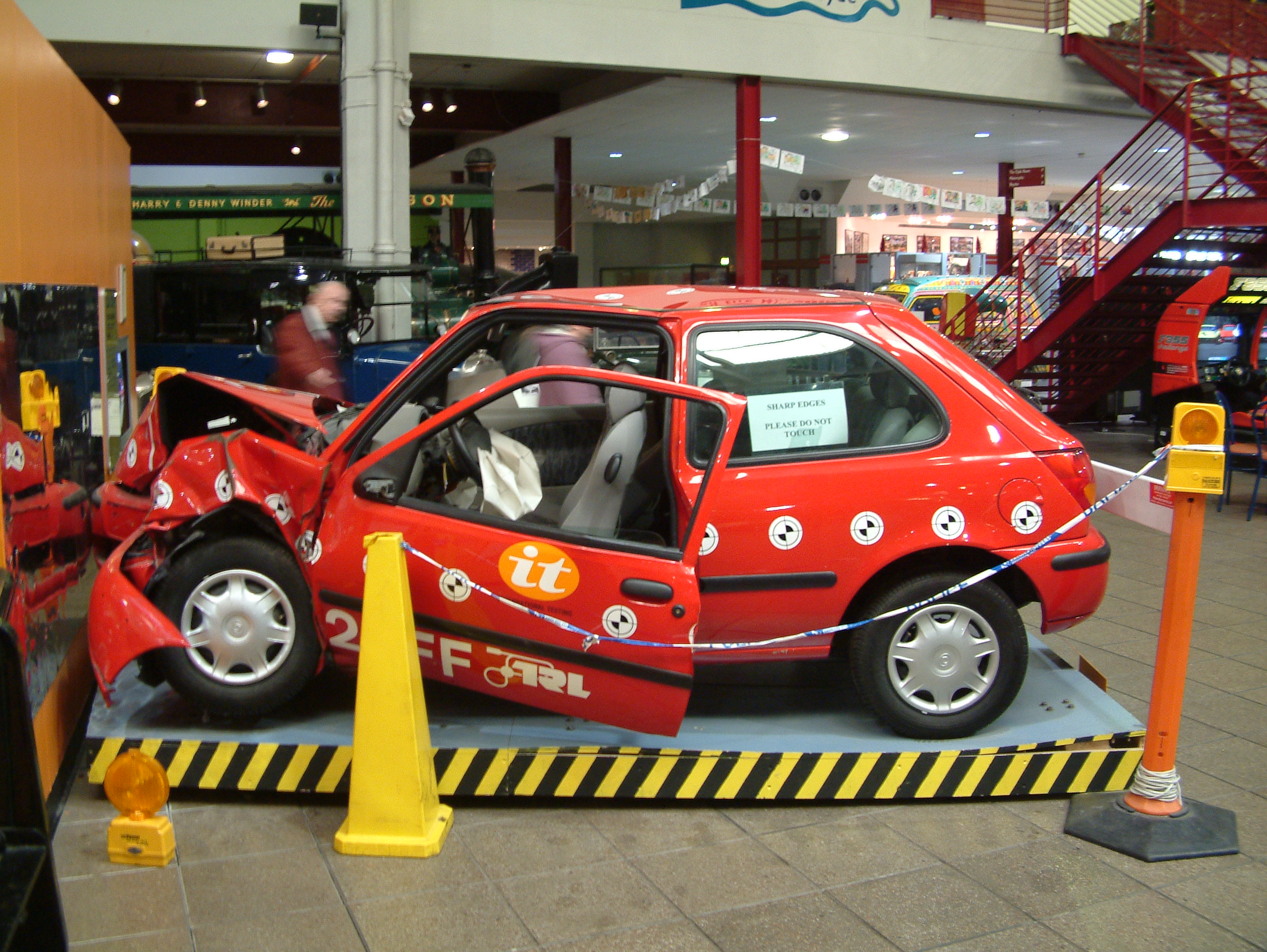
Mazda 121 (re-badged Ford Fiesta) crash test car from the British Transport Research Laboratory

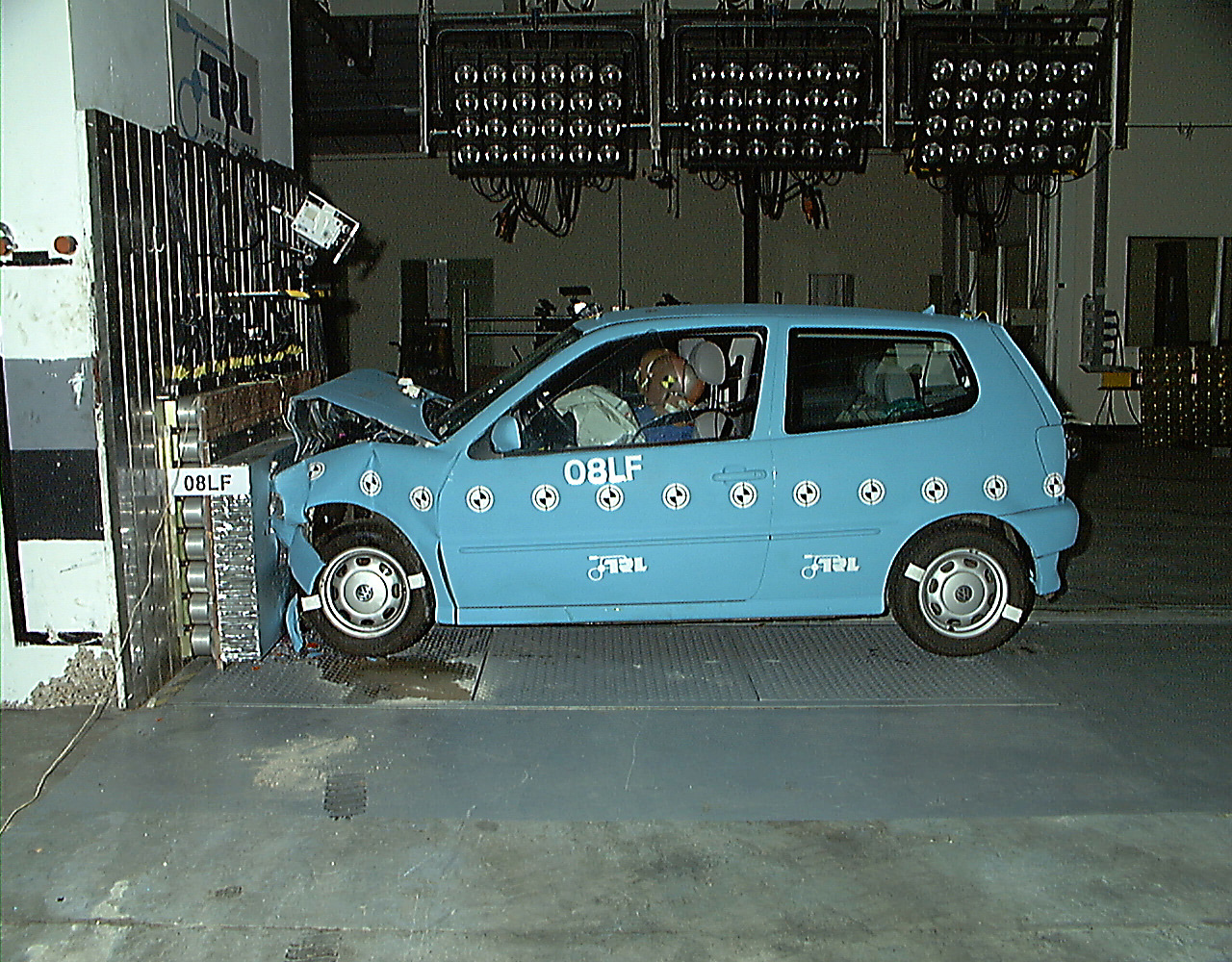
Volkswagen Polo after a full frontal crash test into a deformable wall at the Transport Research Laboratory

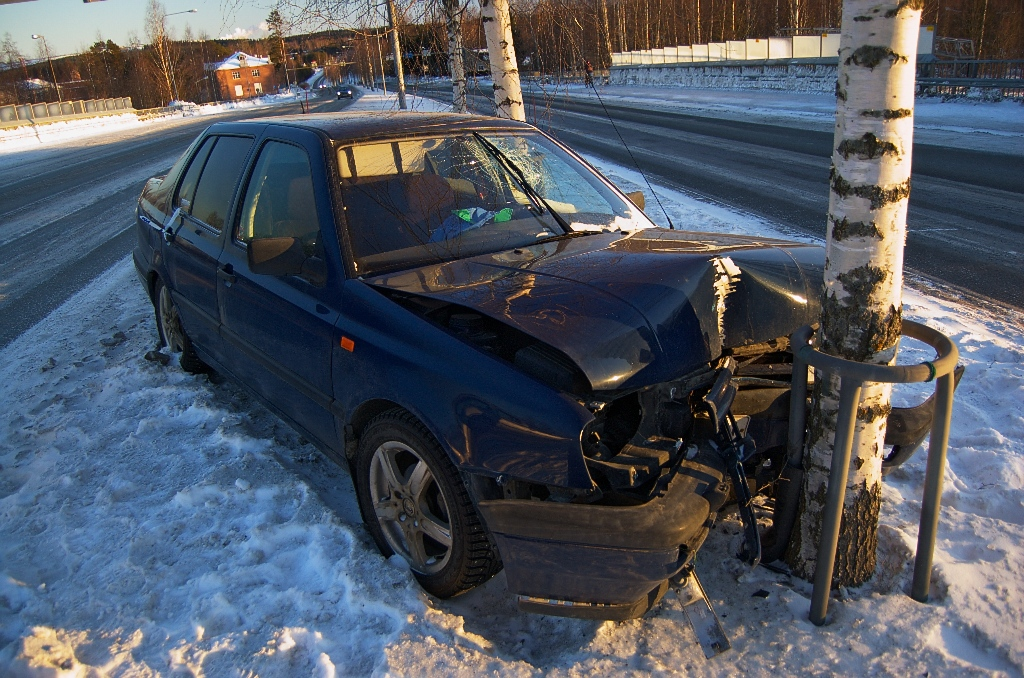
VW Vento / Jetta activated front crumple zone

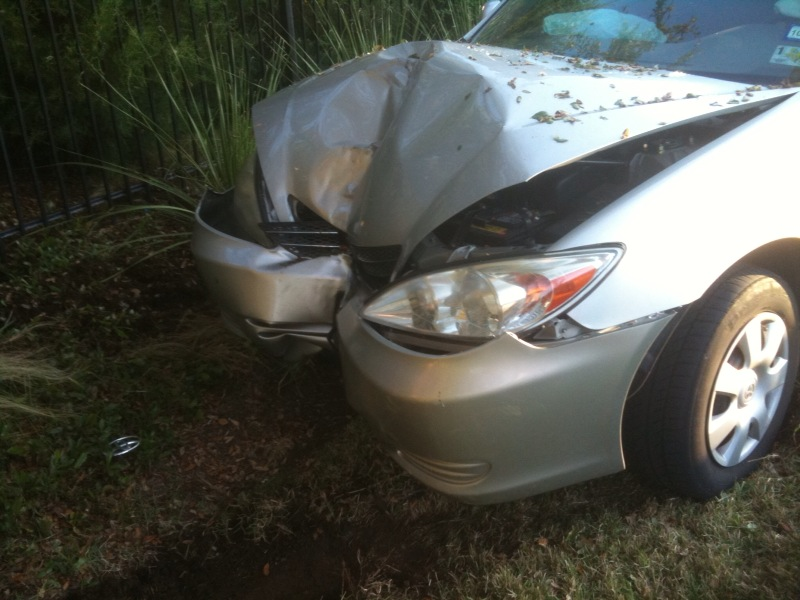
A Toyota Camry after a front impact with a tree. Airbags were deployed.

Crumple zones work by managing crash energy and increasing the time over which the deceleration of the occupants of the vehicle occurs, while also preventing intrusion into or deformation of the passenger cabin. This better protects car occupants against injury. This is achieved by controlled weakening of sacrificial outer parts of the car, while strengthening and increasing the rigidity of the inner part of the body of the car, making the passenger cabin into a "safety cell", by using more reinforcing beams and higher strength steels. Impact energy that does reach the "safety cell" is spread over as wide an area as possible to reduce its deformation. Volvo introduced the side crumple zone with the introduction of the SIPS (Side Impact Protection System) in the early 1990s.

When a vehicle and all its contents, including passengers and luggage are travelling at speed, they have inertia / momentum, which means that they will continue forward with that direction and speed (Newton's first law of motion). In the event of a sudden deceleration of a rigid-framed vehicle due to impact, unrestrained vehicle contents will continue forwards at their previous speed due to inertia, and impact the vehicle interior, with a force equivalent to many times their normal weight due to gravity. The purpose of crumple zones is to slow down the collision to increase the time over which the occupants decelerate so as to decrease the peak force imparted on the occupants over a given time.

Seatbelts restrain the passengers so they don't fly through the windshield, and are in the correct position for the airbag and also increase the time over which the occupants decelerate. Seat belts also absorb passenger inertial energy by being designed to stretch during an impact, again to increase the time over which an occupant decelerates. The NHTSA reports that utilizing a seat belt can reduce the risk of sustaining a fatal injury by 50%. In short: a passenger whose body is decelerated more slowly due to the crumple zone (and other devices) over a longer time survives much more often than a passenger whose body indirectly impacts a hard, undamaged metal car body which has come to a halt nearly instantaneously. This difference in deceleration is analogous to the difference between slamming someone into a wall headfirst (fracturing their skull) and shoulder-first (bruising their flesh slightly) – the arm, being softer, takes tens of times longer to slow its speed than the hard skull, which must deal with extremely high pressure the moment it comes in contact with the wall. As seatbelts stretch while restraining occupants during an impact, it is necessary to replace them if a vehicle is repaired and put back on the road after a collision. They should also be replaced if their condition has deteriorated e.g. through fraying or mechanical or belt mounting faults. In New Zealand it is officially mandatory to replace worn inertia reel type seatbelts only with "webbing grabber" type belts that have less play and are more effective on older cars. Newer cars have electronically fired pre-tension seatbelts that are timed to work with the airbag firing. Buying used seatbelts is not a good idea even in countries where it is legal to do so, because they may have already been stretched in an impact event and may not protect their new users as they should.

The final impact after a passenger's body hits the car interior, airbag or seat belts is that of the internal organs hitting the ribcage or skull due to their inertia. The force of this impact is the way by which many car crashes cause disabling or life-threatening injury. Other ways are skeletal damage and blood loss, because of torn blood vessels, or damage caused by sharp fractured bone to organs and/or blood vessels. The sequence of speed-reducing technologies (crumple zones → seat belt → airbags → padded/deformable interior) are designed to work together as a system to reduce the peak force of the impact on the outside of the passenger's body by lengthening the time over which the crash energy is transferred. In a collision, slowing down the deceleration of the human body by even a few tenths of a second drastically reduces the peak force imparted.

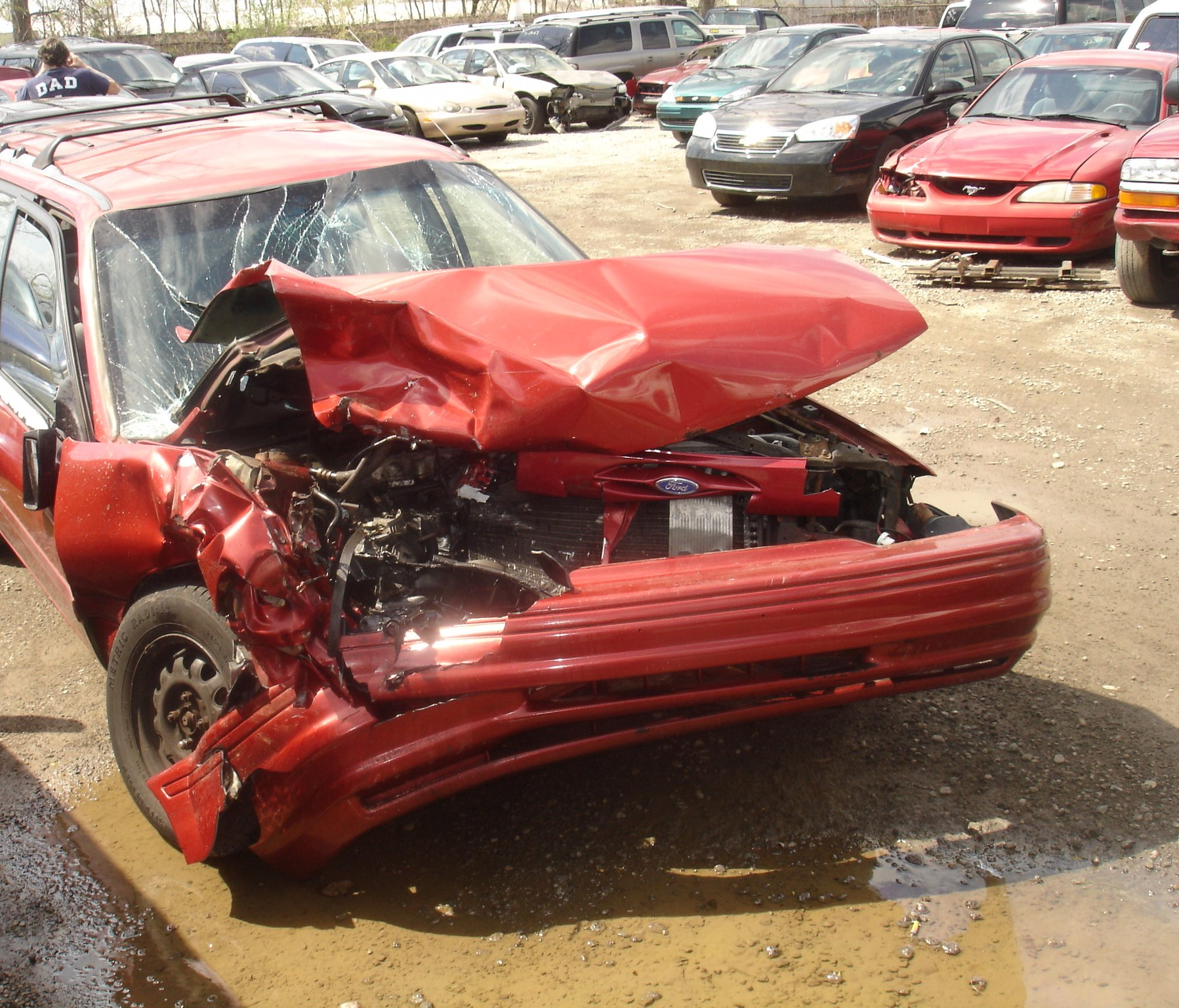
A US market Ford Escort that has been involved in an offset head-on collision with a sport utility vehicle – showing the raised point of impact – missing the car crumple zone

A misconception about crumple zones sometimes voiced is that they reduce safety for the occupants of the vehicle by allowing the body of the vehicle to collapse, therefore risking crushing the occupants. In fact, crumple zones are typically located in front of and behind the main body of the car (which forms a rigid "safety cell"), compacting within the space of the engine compartment or boot/trunk. Modern vehicles utilizing crumple zones provide far superior protection for their occupants in severe tests against other vehicles with crumple zones and solid static objects than older car models or SUVs that use a separate chassis frame and have no crumple zones.

Modern vehicles with crumple zones do tend to come off worse when involved in accidents with SUVs without crumple zones because most of the energy of the impact is absorbed by the vehicle with the crumple zone —however, while the "worse off" vehicle may end up more damaged, the occupants of the car are often less affected by the collision. The result of two vehicles without crumple zones colliding will usually be more hazardous to both vehicles' occupants than a collision that is at least partly buffered.

Another problem is "impact incompatibility" where the "hard points" of the ends of chassis rails of SUVs are higher than the "hard points" of cars, causing the SUV to "override" the engine compartment of the car. In order to tackle this problem, more recent SUV/off-roaders incorporate structures below the front bumper designed to engage lower-height car crumple zones. Volvo's press release about this feature:

Lower cross-member that helps protects lower cars: The front suspension subframe in the new Volvo XC60 is supplemented with a lower cross-member positioned at the height of the beam in a conventional car. The lower cross-member strikes the oncoming car's protective structure, activating its crumple zone as intended so the occupants can be given the maximum level of protection.

== Low speed impact absorption ==
The front of the bumper is designed to withstand low speed collisions, e.g. as in parking bumps to prevent permanent damage to the vehicle. This is achieved by elastic elements, such as the front apron. In some vehicles, the bumper is filled with foam or similar elastic substances. This aspect of design has received more attention in recent years as NCAP crash assessment has added pedestrian impacts to its testing regime. The reduction of rigid support structures in pedestrian impact areas has also been made a design objective.

In the case of less severe collisions (up to approx. 20 km/h), the bumper and outer panel design should ensure that the crumple zone and the load-bearing structure of the vehicle is damaged as little as possible and repairs can be carried out as cheaply as possible. For this purpose, so-called crash tubes or crash boxes are used for mounting bumpers. Crashtubes consist of a hollow steel profile, which transforms the incident energy by rolling up the profile.

== Computer modelled crash simulation ==
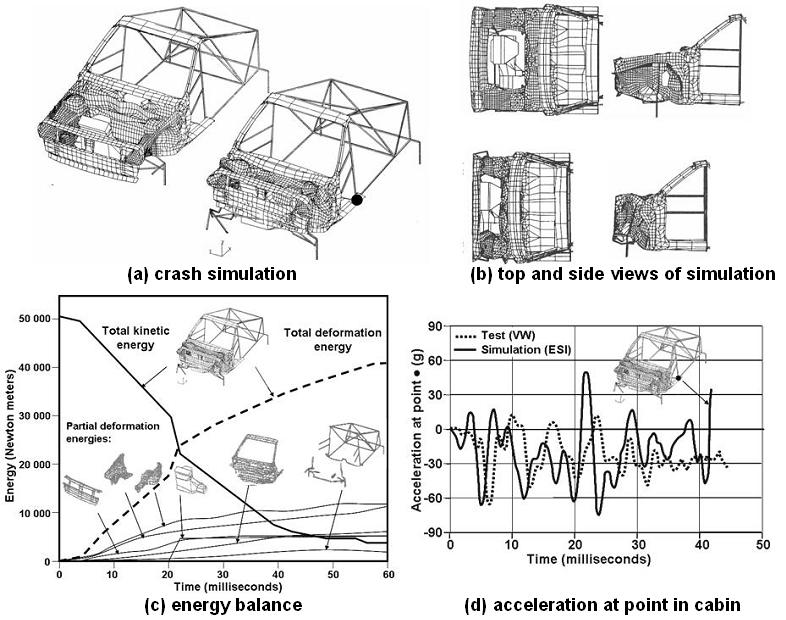
VW Polo first successful frontal full car crash simulation (ESI 1986)

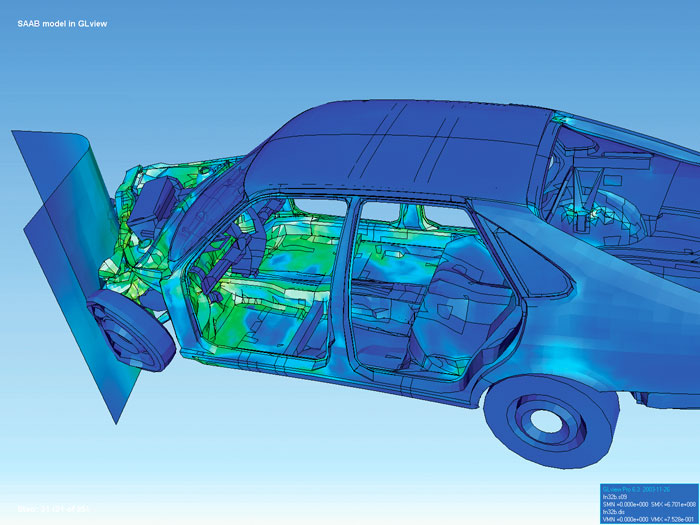
Visualisation of how a car deforms in an asymmetrical crash using finite element analysis

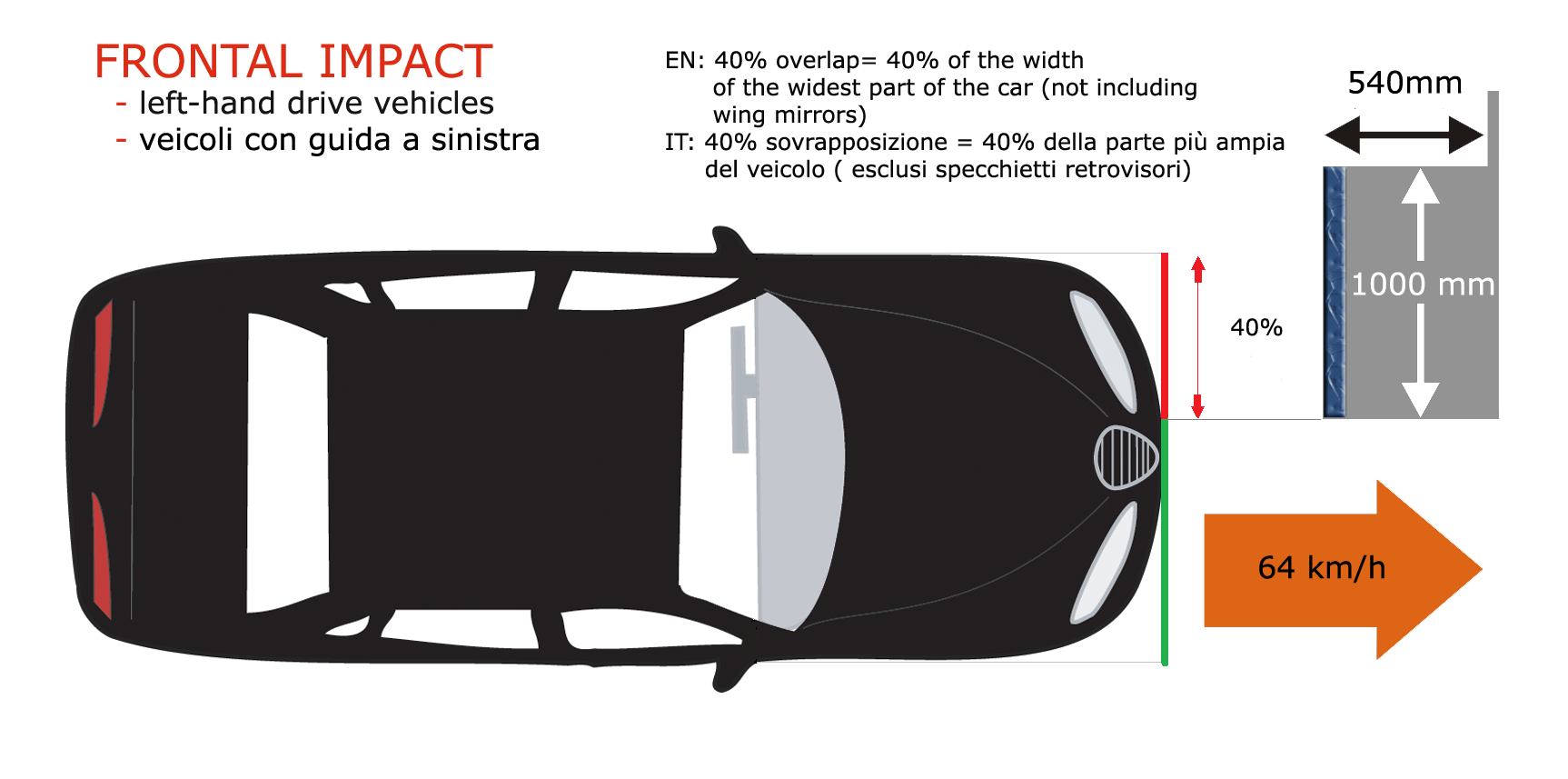
Euro NCAP frontal impact (left-hand drive vehicles)

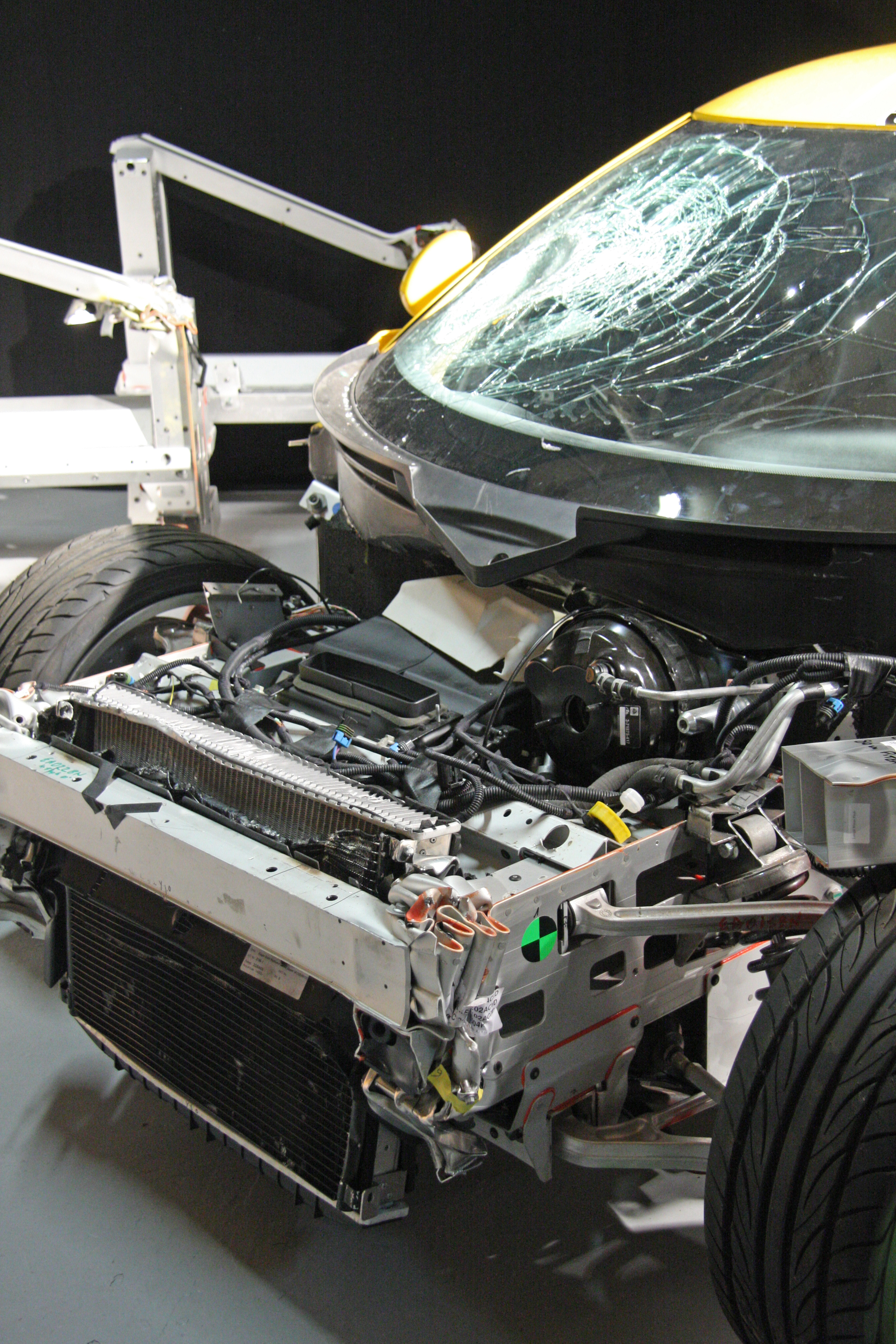
Lotus Evora front crash test showing aluminium chassis crush structure, the height of the rigid front chassis side beams and rigid front cross beam

In the early 1980s, using technology developed for the aerospace and nuclear industries, German car makers started complex computer crash simulation studies, using finite element methods simulating the crash behaviour of individual car body components, component assemblies, and quarter and half cars at the body in white (BIW) stage. These experiments culminated in a joint project by the Forschungsgemeinschaft Automobil-Technik (FAT), a conglomeration of all seven German car makers (Audi, BMW, Ford, Mercedes-Benz, Opel (GM), Porsche, and Volkswagen), which tested the applicability of two emerging commercial crash simulation codes. These simulation codes recreated a frontal impact of a full passenger car structure (Haug 1986) and they ran to completion on a computer overnight. Now that turn-around time between two consecutive job-submissions (computer runs) did not exceed one day, engineers were able to make efficient and progressive improvements of the crash behaviour of the analyzed car body structure. The drive for improved crashworthiness in Europe has accelerated from the 1990s onwards, with the 1997 advent of Euro NCAP, with the involvement of Formula One motor racing safety expertise.

== "Sleds" inside safety cells ==
The 2004 Pininfarina Nido Experimental Safety Vehicle locates crumple zones inside the survival cell. Those interior crumple zones decelerate a sled-mounted survival cell. Volvo has also been developing this idea for use in small cars. Their driver's seat is mounted to what is basically a "sled" on a rail, with shock absorbers in front of it. In an impact, the whole "sled" of driving seat and belted-in driver, slides forward up to 8 inches (20 cm), and the shock absorbers dissipate the peak shock energy of the impact, lengthening the deceleration time for the driver. Simultaneously, the steering wheel and the driver's side dashboard slide forward to make room for the driver, as they are thrown forwards stretching the seatbelt. Combined with a front crumple zone and airbag, this system could greatly reduce the forces acting on the driver in a frontal impact.

== See also ==
- Automobile safety
- Guard rail § Automotive safety
- New Car Assessment Program
- Traffic barrier
