= Sophrology =

Dynamic relaxation method

Sophrology is a dynamic relaxation method developed by neuropsychiatrist Alfonso Caycedo from 1960 to 2001 and includes physical and mental exercises to promote health and well-being. It may help with stress reduction, anxiety management, and improved quality of life.

The influences on sophrology include phenomenology, hypnosis, yoga, Tibetan Buddhist meditation, Japanese Zen meditation, progressive muscle relaxation, autogenic relaxation training, psychology, neurology. It contains a set of exercises that combine breathing and relaxation techniques, gentle movement, creative visualization, meditation, and mindfulness.

It claims beneficial uses in a number of areas ranging from self-development to well-being. As of 2023, there are limited published studies that scientifically validate beneficial effects, quantitative or qualitative, of the sophrology method.

The practice is popular in parts of Europe. In Switzerland and France it is offered to students in schools and at least one insurance company offers reimbursement under their most expensive plan.

== Etymology ==
The word "sophrology" comes from three Ancient Greek words σῶς / sos ("harmony"), φρήν / phren ("mind"), and -λογία / logos ("study, science") and means "the study of the consciousness in harmony" or "the science of the harmony of consciousness".

== History ==
=== Alfonso Caycedo ===
==== Western roots (1960–1963) ====
Professor Alfonso Caycedo (1932–2017) a neuropsychiatrist (doctor, psychiatrist, and neurologist) of Spanish Basque origin was born in Bogota, Colombia, in 1932 and studied medicine in Spain. Caycedo began his medical career at the Provincial Hospital of Madrid administering electric shock therapy and insulin induced comas to patients at the hospital and was unsettled by the severity of these treatments. He then set out to find a way of healing depressed and traumatized clients by leading them to an improved quality of life with the least possible use of drugs and psychiatric treatments.

This led Caycedo to study human consciousness and the means of varying its states and levels. He studied clinical hypnosis, Edmund Husserl’s phenomenology and the relaxation techniques of Edmund Jacobson’s progressive relaxation, Johannes Heinrich Schultz’s autogenic training. From Jacobson’s technique, Caycedo mainly kept the idea of differential relaxation, the ability to reduce anxiety by relaxing muscular tension using only the minimum muscle tension necessary for an action and without additional suggestion or psychotherapy – that muscular relaxation is sufficient for mental relaxation or harmony. With Schultz’s technique, Caycedo was inspired by the human ability to achieve relaxation by visualization alone.

Originally Caycedo based the new method on hypnosis although due to the reception to hypnosis he created the term "sophrology" in October 1960 and in December 1960 he opened the first department of clinical sophrology in the Santa Isabel Hospital in Madrid.

==== Phenomenology (1963–1964) ====
Between 1963 and 1964, Caycedo moved to Switzerland and worked under the psychiatrist and phenomenologist Ludwig Binswanger at the Bellevue Clinic In Kreuzlingen and was very much influenced by his work.

==== Eastern roots (1965–1968) ====
In 1963, Caycedo married a French yoga enthusiast. Intrigued by the works of yoga and encouraged by Binswanger, Caycedo travelled to India and Japan from 1965 to 1968 where he studied yoga, Tibetan Buddhist meditation and Japanese Zen. He approached each discipline, theory and philosophy with the intention of discovering what, exactly, improved people's health, both physically and mentally. In India, he discovered Raja Yoga in the ashram of Swami Anandanand and Sri Aurobindo's integral yoga. He then travelled to Dharamsala to study Tibetan Buddhism and to meet the Dalai Lama. Lastly, he went to Japan to learn Zen in several monasteries.

During his absence, Caycedo asked Doctors Raymond Abrezol and Armand Dumont to take charge and continue the dissemination of sophrology.

==== Spain, Colombia, Andorra (1968–2017) ====
In 1968, on his return from his travels in India and Japan, Caycedo settled in Barcelona, Spain, where he started expanding sophrology and created the first three levels of what he called Dynamic Relaxation. Caycedo initiated sophrology group work in Paris and continued the dissemination of sophrology at scientific conferences in Spain, Switzerland and Belgium. From then on, sophrology started to move away from clinical hypnosis and concentrated more on body work and the presence of the body in the mind. His idea was to help the Western mind use Eastern methods in a simple way, leaving aside the philosophy and religion, with the aim of enabling people to experience new ways of working on their levels of consciousness.

In 1970, at the first International sophrology Conference, he said that sophrology was born from his studies on human consciousness. Sophrology is both philosophy and a way of life, as well as a therapy and a personal development technique. He later said that sophrology is "learning to live".

During the early years sophrology was kept exclusively within the field of medicine and the Association of Medical Sophrology was formed which created the branch of "medical" sophrology. Subsequently, a second branch was created, that of "social" sophrology, which was inaugurated at the Recife Congress in August 1977.

In 1985, while in Colombia, Caycedo created the fourth level of Dynamic Relaxation.

In 1988, Caycedo moved to Andorra and created the concept of Caycedo sophrology, which he later trademarked.

In 1992, Caycedo started the following levels and created a master's degree.

By 2001, Caycedo had completed the twelve levels, or twelve degrees, of Caycedian Dynamic Relaxation (CDR) and their specific techniques.

Caycedo trademarked the name Caycedian sophrology. The word sophrology is not trademarked. The drift from the original method, as developed by Caycedo, means that today a distinction exists between Caycedian sophrology and sophrology, with non-Caycedian training schools offering different versions of the method.

=== Raymond Abrezol ===
In Switzerland, Raymond Abrezol (1931–2010), a Swiss doctor and dentist, discovered sophrology and brought it to the attention of the general public. Abrezol started practicing sophrology in 1963, met Caycedo in 1964 in Kreuzlingen, and became one of the pioneers of this method.

After finishing his sophrology studies in 1965, Abrezol helped two friends improve their performance, one in tennis and the other in skiing, using sophrology. In 1967, a national ski coach asked Abrezol to train four Swiss ski athletes for the Grenoble Winter Olympic Games of 1968, resulting in three winning Olympic medals. This led to Abrezol training athletes in boxing, cycling, fencing, sailing, skating, aerobatic pilots, tennis, water polo, golf, and other sports and athletes coached by Abrezol won over 200 Olympic and World Championship medals between 1967 and 2004.

Athletes that included specifically designed sophrology exercises as part of their preparation included Bernhard Russi, Roland Collombin, Walter Tresch, Werner Mattle, Lise Marie Morerod and Marie-Therese Nadig (skiers); Walther Steiner and Hans Schmid (ski jumpers); Fritz Chervet (boxer), Dill Bundi (cyclist), Silvio Giobelina (bobsledder), and Pierre Fehlmann (navigator).

Following this success, sophrology grew rapidly throughout the French-speaking world. Abrezol ran training programmes for a large number of doctors and sports coaches, many of whom then ran Training Centers throughout France. Although initially used only in medicine, Abrezol's success with athletes opened doors for Sophrology to be taught in many areas of life from sports to education, the arts, well-being in the corporate world, and in other disciplines.

== Fundamental principles ==
Positive action

- Sophrology doesn't concentrate on the problem itself but on the inner resources and positive elements of the individual. The assumption is that positive action on consciousness starts a positive chain reaction. According to Pascal Gautier, "Through an everyday practice, sophrology aims at harmony in human beings! In practice, it does not mean seeing life through pink-tinted glasses but putting an end to an unrealistic or negative vision of life to see things as they are (as much as possible) and reinforce whatever positive we have in us."

Objective reality

- Be free from judgement – awareness of any judgement, either of others or of ourselves, and adopting a non-judgmental attitude.
- As if for the first time – having a "beginner's mind" and taking it in without using previous knowledge or experiences.

== Applications ==
Sophrology use has been indicated in the following areas:

- Self-development
- Stress management
- Disease-related distress
- Sleep improvement
- Exam preparation – in Switzerland and France, sophrology is offered to students in schools to help with exam preparation and exam stress
- Sports performance – athletes coached by Raymond Abrezol won over 200 Olympic and World Championship medals; it has reportedly been used by the French rugby team; it has been used by the Swiss Clay Pigeon Shooting champions to train for the European Championships 2012
- "Meditation alternatives for people who can’t sit still"
- Preparing for a specific event
- Birth preparation
- In Japanese popular culture, sophrology (ソフロロジー) is known as a relaxation method for childbirth (ソフロロジー分娩法)

== Science ==
=== Scientific validity of the beneficial effects ===
There are limited but emerging studies to scientifically validate the beneficial effects, quantitative or qualitative, claimed by the sophrology method.

In 2019, a randomized controlled trial in Spain was carried out to determine the effects of sophrology’s dynamic relaxation techniques on anxiety and mood in primary care patients. Seventy patients with moderate and high anxiety levels, according to the HADS-Anxiety subscale questionnaire (cut-off >8), were randomly distributed to i) sophrology (wellbeing and sophrology program) or ii) a physical and mental health recommendations (PMHR) program. Conclusion: An intensive four-week structured group relaxation-training program "well-being and sophrology" was highly effective in reducing anxiety and depression symptoms in primary care patients with moderate and high anxiety levels. The results demonstrated that the sophrology program was equally effective in persons of any age and gender. Authors added that sophrology training might be a choice for those patients with medium or high anxiety levels, suffering from important psychopharmacological side effects or intolerance but also for those patients at medium risk for anxiety disorders, interested in developing healthy psycho-physical habits, personal resources and coping strategies.

A landmark 2020 randomized controlled trial (RCT) at the University of Barcelona compared sophrology (12 sessions over 4 weeks) against standard psychoeducation in 70 primary care patients with moderate-to-severe anxiety (HADS-A ≥8)2. The intervention group showed: 54% reduction in HADS-Anxiety scores (7.6 to 4.1, p<0.001), 48% decrease in depressive symptoms (HADS-D 7.6 to 4.1), Large effect sizes for state anxiety (Cohen’s d = 1.36) surpassing active controls (d = 0.41). Notably, trait anxiety—a stable personality characteristic—decreased significantly (p<0.001), suggesting sophrology may induce neuroplastic changes beyond situational stress relief.

The SOphrology Intervention to Improve WELL-Being (SO-WELL) trial at Clermont-Ferrand University Hospital measures biomarkers in 200 stressed healthcare professionals34. Data after 8 sessions shows: 29% increase in HRV (RMSSD 28ms to 36ms), 22% lower cortisol awakening response, 18% reduction in emotional exhaustion (MBI subscore). Notably, the study incorporates salivary DHEAS and skin conductance to objectively quantify stress resilience—a methodological advancement over prior self-report measures.
