= Transportation Research Center =

Coordinates: 40.3°N 83.55°W

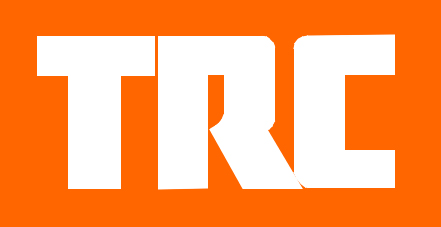

The Transportation Research Center (TRC) is North America's largest multi-user automotive proving ground. It is operated by TRC Inc. The center occupies 4,500 acres in East Liberty, Ohio, about 40 miles northwest of Columbus, Ohio. These 4,500 acres are split between the main TRC property and a rural road/ATV course located approximately 2.5 miles from the main property.

The National Highway Traffic Safety Administration (NHTSA) has its Vehicle Research and Test Center (VRTC) on TRC property. TRC is the only North American proving ground with a government research and test center on site.

== TRC Inc. ==
TRC Inc. is the managing company for TRC, including facilities, land, and testing. The firm has more than 400 employees. In addition to running TRC, it provides contract services, as well as government testing and a performance driving school. TRC Inc. is ISO 9001 and ISO 14001 registered, and maintains a 17025 accreditation within a given scope for emissions and crash testing.

The firm conducts programs designed to test for safety, energy, fuel economy, emissions, durability, noise, crash, crash simulation and performance. It tests trucks, buses, recreational vehicles, motorcycles, electric vehicles, passenger cars and components.

Brett Roubinek has been president and CEO of TRC Inc. since January 2018.

== History ==
In 1962, the College of Engineering at The Ohio State University (OSU) established a center to coordinate and encourage transportation-related academic and research programs. The university envisioned a facility for controlled transportation research without using public roadways, with their control and safety problems. The concept was funded by a portion of the proceeds of a State of Ohio highway bond issue approved by the voters in 1968. TRC was funded to enhance the health, safety, and personal welfare of all inhabitants of the State of Ohio.

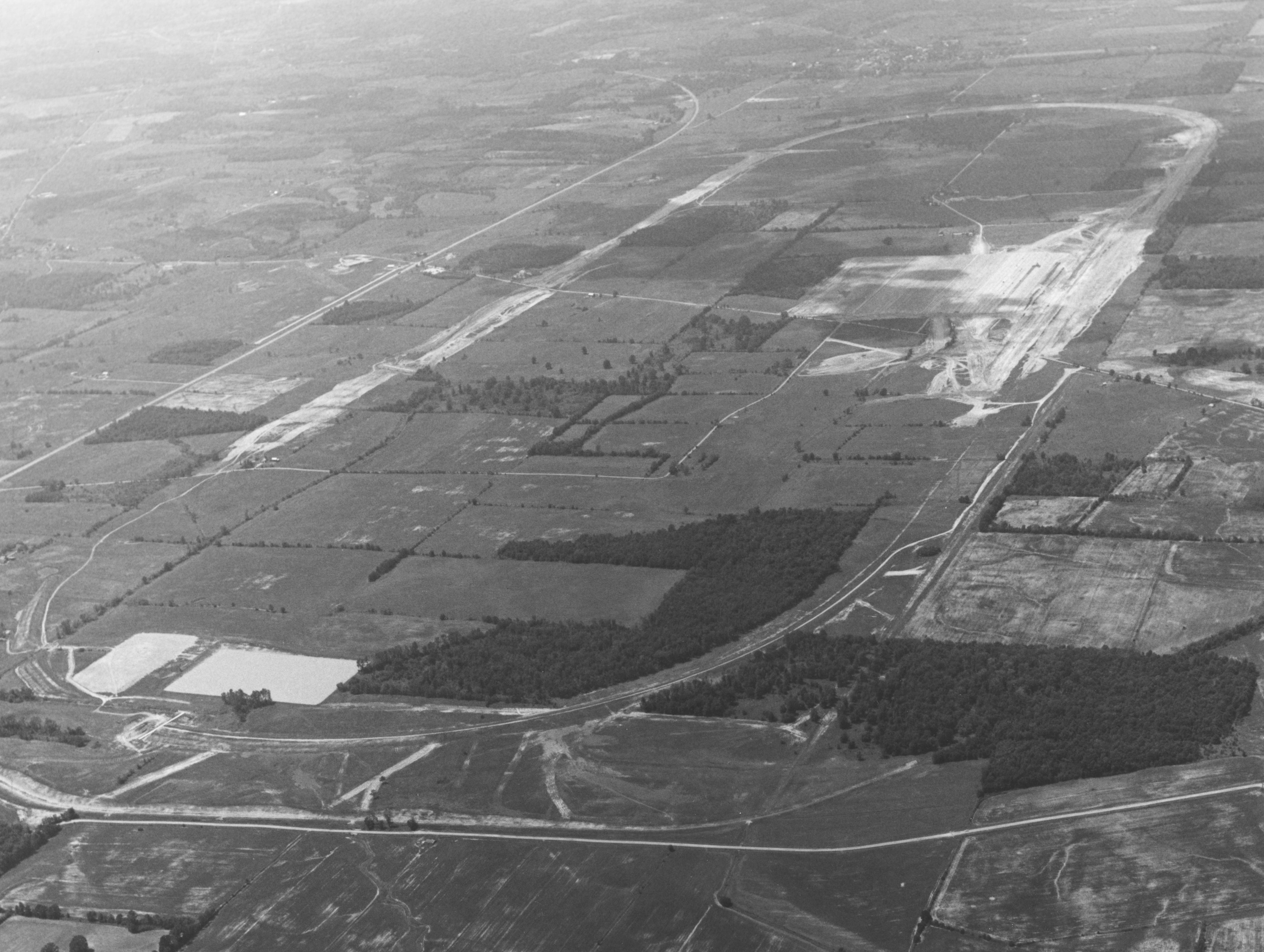

In 1968, the State of Ohio purchased 8,100 acres of land and construction began. Since opening in 1974, TRC has operated on its own revenues. In 1972, the Ohio Legislature created TRC of Ohio and established the Transportation Research Board for the control, management, supervision, and direction of the Center. Subsequently, the Board hired a staff to operate the facilities.

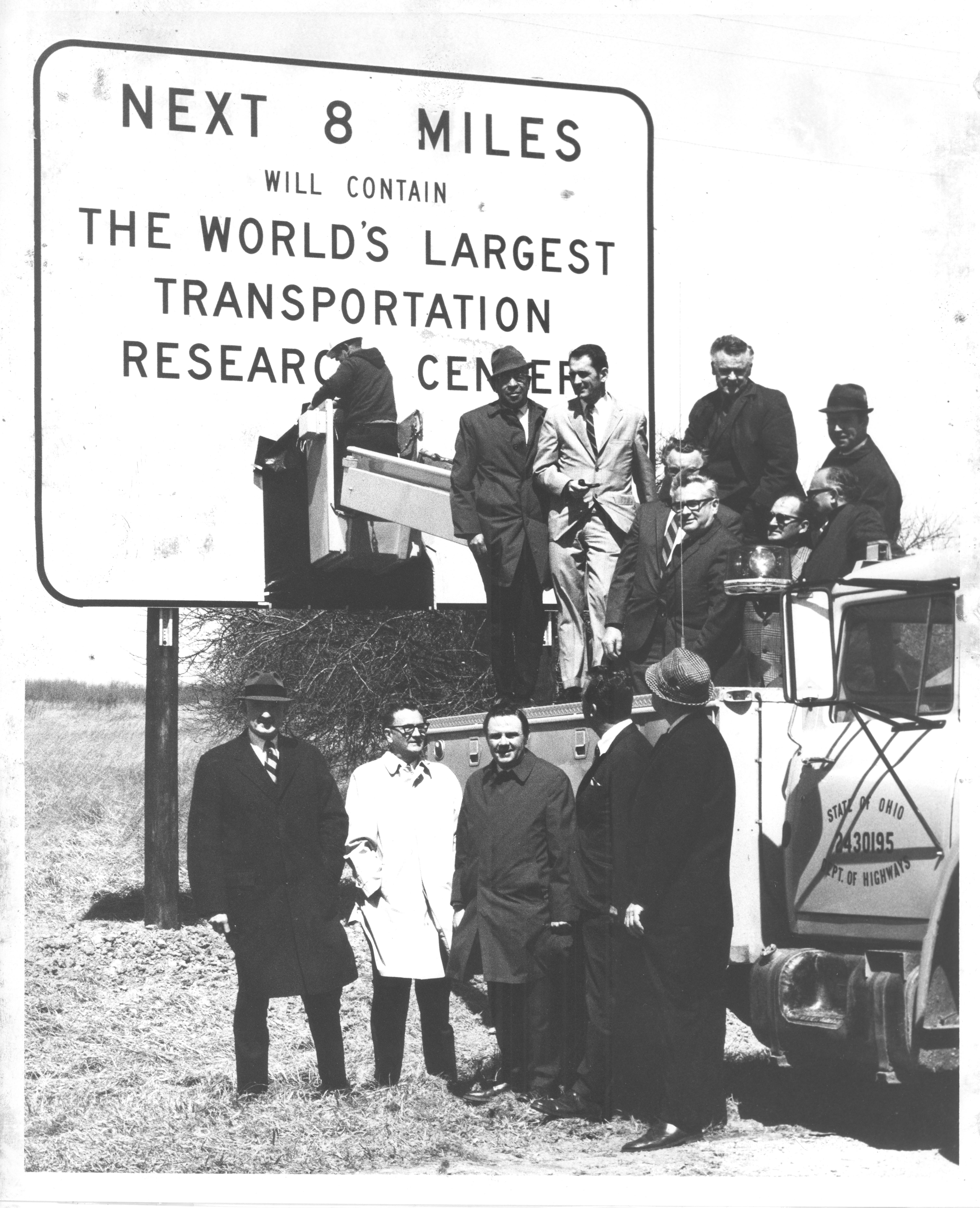

In June 1979, the Board contracted with OSU to manage the operations and staff of the TRC of Ohio. In September 1987, TRC's property was offered as part of an economic inducement to attract Honda to build an automobile plant in Ohio. On January 26, 1988, the property sale was consummated and TRC Inc. was formed as successor to the Transportation Research Board. TRC Inc., a non-profit Ohio corporation, affiliated with OSU, entered into a management agreement with Honda to continue to operate the TRC as a multi-user, independent test site. The present TRC Inc. is a 501c3, an affiliated entity of OSU, and is the facility manager for the Honda owned property (TRC).

== Facilities ==
=== Outdoor Facilities ===

High Speed Test Track: 7.5-mile (12.1-km) oval test track contains four asphalt lanes on the front straightaway and curves and five asphalt lanes on the back straightaway. The 7.5-mile test track's parabolic banking allows neutral speeds up to 140 mph (225 km/h). The test track features level 2-mile (3.2 km) straightaways.

Vehicle Dynamics Area: 50-acre (20-hectare) asphalt pad, with an acceleration loop at each end, is a multipurpose facility for vehicle dynamic testing, durability testing, brake testing, performance testing, product demonstrations, and driver training. It also includes a Jennite Pad.

Basalt & Ceramic Tile Low Mu Surfaces: Contains a 10-meter x 300-meter basalt course with a .25 slide and a 7.5-meter x 100-meter ceramic surface with a .15 slide. Both of these facilities can handle up to 80,000 lbs. and have their own self-contained watering systems. TRC also offers basalt and ceramic tile facilities as well as jennite surfaces. Profile Roads: includes Tire Slap, Unsprung Mass Vibration, Long Curb, Water Drain, Speed Bumps, Road Joint, Undulation Road, Positive & Negative Shocks, Stability Road, Belgian Block Roads, Chip & Seal Roads, Concrete Choppy Road, Concrete Downhill Wavy, Concrete European Union Road and a High Speed Railroad Crossing.

ISO Noise Pad: A 65-ft. by 123-ft. pad allows manufacturers an opportunity to evaluate their products to ISO noise requirements.

Skid Pad: Used for brake and low speed durability testing. This 84-ft. by 9,000-ft. facility contains five smooth lanes for braking flanked by two lanes utilized for rough road durability testing. The durability courses contain rough road surfaces such as resonance, impact and chatter bumps, chuckholes, V-ditches, twists and washboards. This facility also contains 6 crosswind generators capable of a 40-mph output.

Dynamic Handling Course: 1.75 mile asphalt course consisting of a variety of slow, medium, and high-speed corners, slight elevation changes, and turns of varying camber. Winding Road Course: 1.5-mile winding road course with wet and dry pavement capabilities. This course also contains two depth-controlled hydroplane test areas as well as a 203-foot radius wet vehicle dynamics handling area.

Bus & Truck Durability Course: The 2,000-foot by 24-foot wide course consists of: staggered bumps, sine wave course, chuckholes, chatter bumps and a high crown intersection.

Cobblestone Durability Course: 1,320-foot roadway features two parallel strips with an average cobble protrusion of 1.5 inches.

Brake Slope & Soak: Contains concrete roadways with grades of 12, 15, 20, and 30% for brake holding, clutch, differential, and durability testing. The brake soak is a 25-foot wide circular water trough containing a 5% slope on the outer edge to allow immersion of only half the vehicle's braking system.

Gravel Durability Course: Level 2.6-mile (4.2-km) Gravel Durability Course provides a series of twists, turns, and straightaways.

Salt Spray Road, Stone Chipping Road, Curb Impact, & Chuckholes: consists of parallel 20-foot x 990-foot lanes. One lane consists of both high and low spray saline solution, 3% by volume. The other lane provides a vehicle testing course to allow stone chipping of test vehicles.

Paved Rough Roads & Salt Bath: Ideal for durability testing of passenger cars to sport utility vehicles compromises 855 ft. of light duty and 1,215 ft. of medium duty concrete bumps embedded in a 4,200-ft. asphalt roadway. The 60 by 14-ft. Salt Bath is adjustable from 3 to 15-in. deep.

Off-Road Durability Courses: Contains jagged and riverbed rocks, a rock road, a serpentine sand course, frame twists, an under-guard clearance course, and multiple curb trip courses.

Off-Road Mobility Courses: Contains concrete 40, 50 and 60% grades, a sand hill, loose stone and dirt hills, a 20% washboard hill, frame twists, a multiple-approach angled gully, a multiple log-crossing area and three different size boulder crossings.

Paved & Gravel Hilly Road Courses: Contains over eight miles of roadway including a 1,000-foot, 10% asphalt slope, various stone slopes, a 23% asphalt slope, a 1.5-mile gravel road, two level cross-country courses and an off-road course.

ATV Courses: Washboards, logs, hills, and mud pits complete this ATV testing facility.

=== Impact Laboratory ===
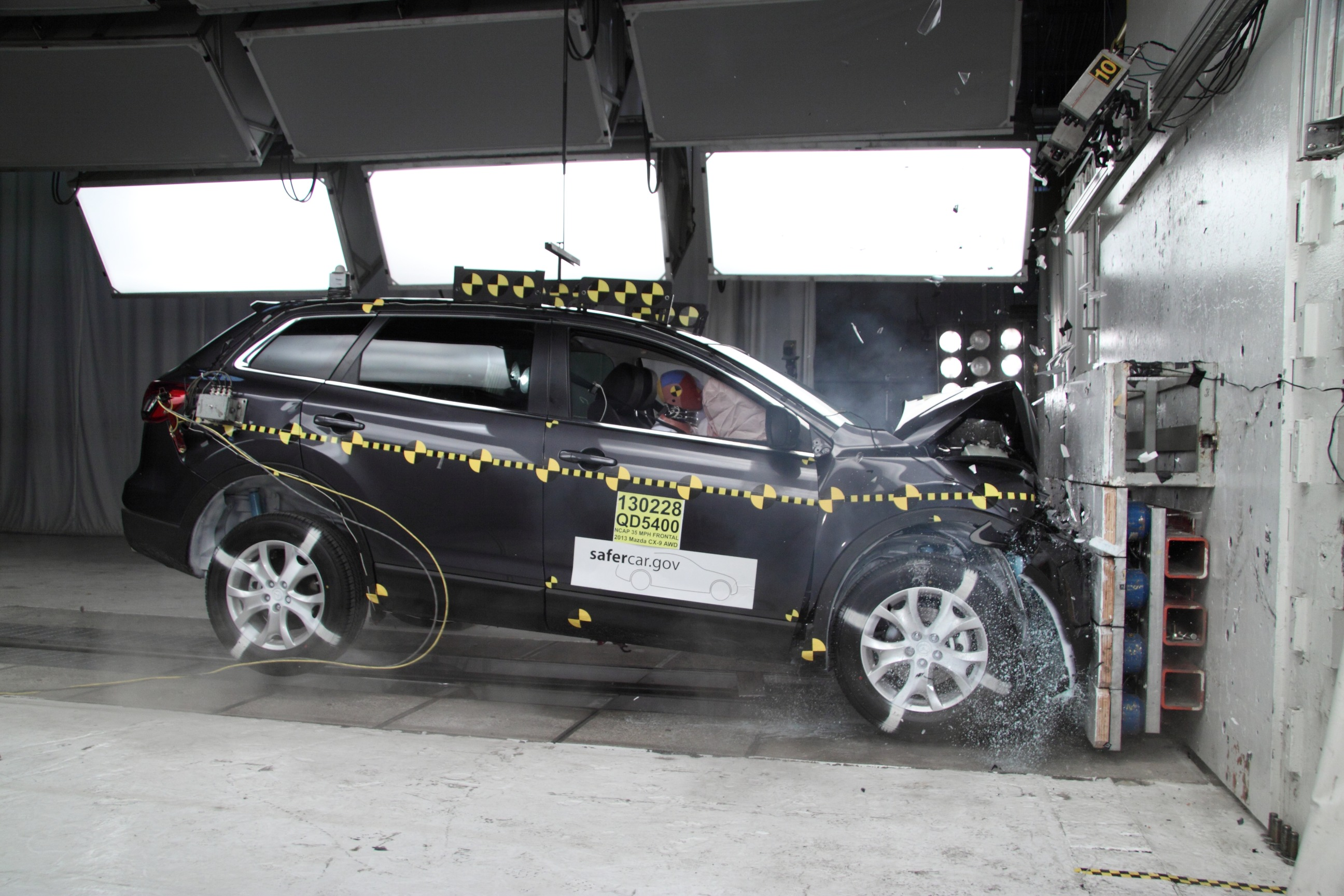

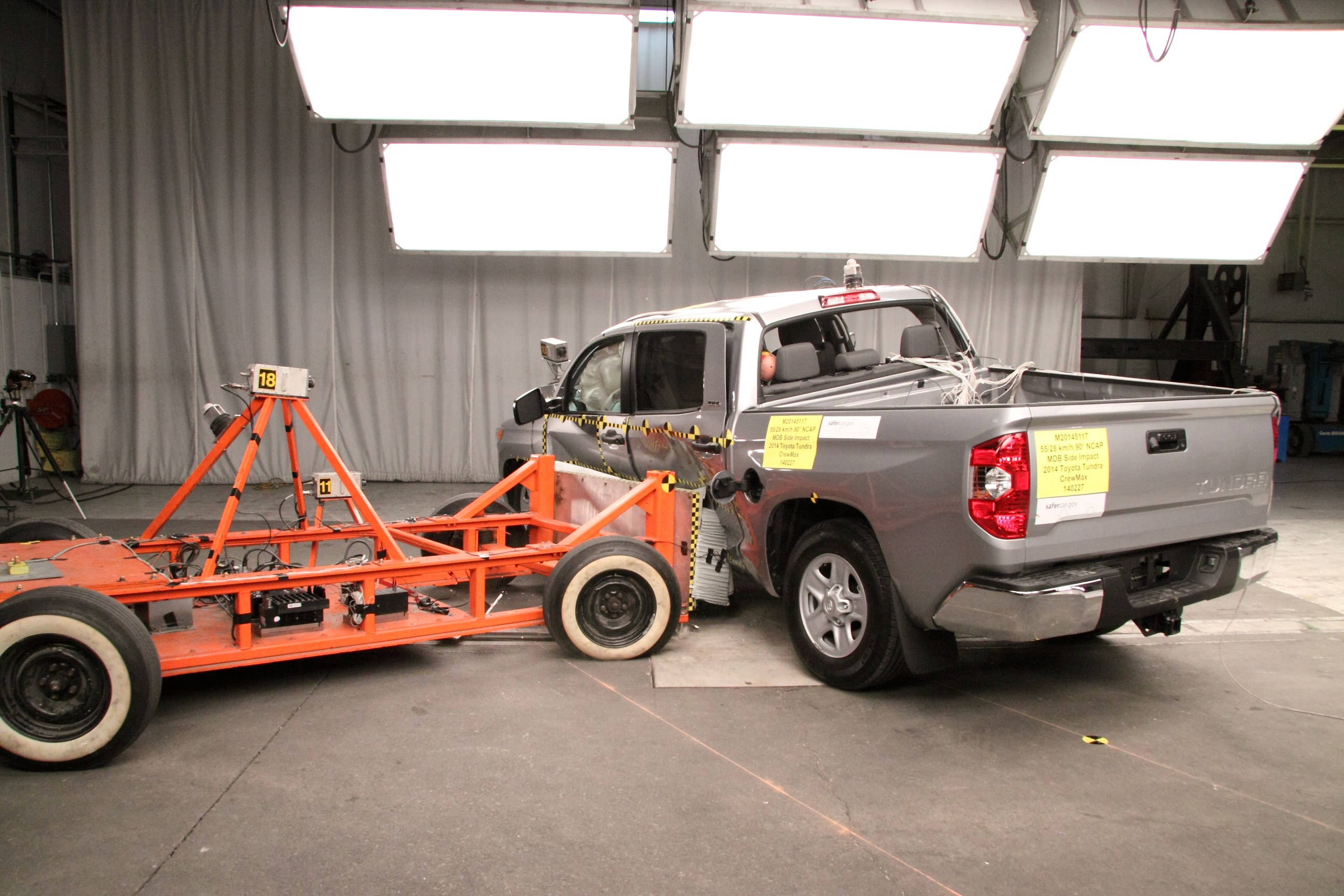

Provides full service Impact Laboratory and a comprehensive vehicle safety development facility. Vehicle crash testing, impact simulation, highway appurtenances, automotive component static testing, dummy and instrumentation calibration labs are located in TRC's facilities.

Crash Barrier: The enclosed crash barrier is capable of testing vehicles up to 10,000 lbs. at velocities up to 60 mph.

Outdoor Impact Area: Capable of impacting two moving vehicles at any angle at velocities up to 100 mph.

Impact Simulator: 24-in. HYGE pneumatic drive can carry a payload of 10,000 lbs. at 44 g's, simulating a crash speed of 71 mph. Lighter payloads can be accelerated to velocities of 100 mph.

Component Laboratory: The static test laboratory features computer-controlled hydraulic cylinders positioned to apply and record loads at specified rate of force and displacement.

Calibration Laboratory: Accelerometers, load cells, pressure gauges and transducers, anthropomorphic test dummies, position transducers, electrical measuring instrument calibration, including digital multimeters and temperature meters, and torque wrenches.

=== Contract Engineering ===
Contract Services offers a wide range of services including research, development, testing, and analysis in the following areas: Vehicle components, crashworthiness, crash avoidance, bio mechanics, test devices, test procedures, product evaluations, mechanical support, and test driving.

=== Emissions Laboratory ===
Supports chassis based exhaust emissions testing of motorcycles, ATVs, UTVs, passenger vehicles and light duty trucks. Small to medium size motorcycle and ATV testing is performed on a Horiba chassis dynamometer with a single axle 20 inch diameter smooth roll. Large motorcycle, UTV, passenger vehicle and light duty truck testing is performed on an AVL 2 axle All Wheel Drive (AWD) chassis dynamometer with 48 inch diameter smooth rolls. The AWD dynamometer can be operated in front wheel drive, rear wheel drive or AWD modes. Both chassis dynamometers are AC motoring and meet EPA requirements for chassis based exhaust emission and Deterioration Factor Service accumulation testing. Exhaust emissions are measured using a 2013 model year AVL iGem i60 CVS dilute emissions bench. The bench is capable of measuring tailpipe exhaust emissions produced by gasoline and diesel engines. The AWD dynamometer Test Cell temperature can be set for vehicle testing between 20F (-6C) and 100F (38C).

== See also ==
- John A. Volpe National Transportation Systems Center

== Sources ==
- website
- NHTSA.gov website
