= Alfonso Caycedo =

Colombian academic

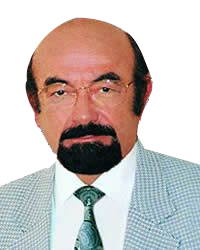
- Born: November 19, 1932; Bogotá, Colombia
- Died: September 11, 2017 (aged 84); Barcelona, Spain
- Occupations: Professor, neuropsychiatrist
- Known for: Sophrology

Alfonso Caycedo (in full: Alfonso Caycedo Lozano; 19 November 1932 – 11 September 2017) was a Colombian academic. He was the founder of sophrology, a form of self-development.

Caycedo also founded Sofrocay, the International Caycedian Sophrology Academy based in Andorra, where his Caycedian methods are practiced.

== Biography ==
Caycedo was born on 19 November 1932 in Bogotá. Following his early education in Colombia, He moved to Spain to study in the faculty of medicine at the university of Madrid where he became a doctor of medicine and surgery. He specialised in psychiatry and neurology under the direction of Juan Josė López-Ibor (1906–1991), professor of psychiatry at the University of Madrid.

While in Spain, Caycedo began to develop his own psychiatric method. He was interested in the medical use of hypnosis, but weary of the public reception of that term. To distance himself and his method from contemporary mystics, he coined the term sophrology in October, 1960 to describe his technique. The same year he founded the first department of clinical sophrology at Madrid University. In practice, sophrologists came to utilize a combination of hypnosis and humanistic psychology.

In 1963, Caycedo met Ludwig Binswanger, the Swiss founder of phenomenological psychiatry. Caycedo became familiar with the method of investigation of consciousness proposed by Husserl and Heidegger which influenced the direction of his own research in that field. Expounding upon this influence, Caycedo attempted to make existential phenomenology accessible and practical through sophrology. The direction of his research turned to modified states of consciousness with a phenomenology-inspired approach.

Caycedo later spent time in India where he learned Yoga from Yogis whom he met through Indian doctors. In the Himalayas, he met one of the doctors of the 14th Dalai-Lama, who introduced Caycedo to methods such as Tummo, a Tibetan breathing exercise which is meant to help the user reach modified states of consciousness. Caycedo also visited Japan where he studied Zazen. Caycedo recognised emphasis on the body as the unifying principle in these different methods, which he carried over to sophrology.

In Barcelona from 1968 to 1982, Caycedo gained his Professorship at the School of Psychiatry at the University of Barcelona in the faculty of medicine. During this period, Caycedo did extensive experimentation and research on his theories of Dynamic Relaxation (exercise in slow movement).

- 1970 First World Congress of Sophrology was held in Barcelona with 1400 specialists and 42 countries represented. The future king of Spain, Juan Carlos was the president of honour along with the future queen, Sofia.
- 1973 European Symposium in Lausanne, Brussels where the first collective sophrology training took place in Paris.
- 1975 The Second World Congress of Sophrology was held in Barcelona.
- 1977 The First Pan-American Symposium of Sophrology was held in Recife (Brazil).

From 1982 to 1988, Caycedo developed sophrology in Bogotá. It was presented in 1985 at the Pitié-Salpêtrière Hospital in the Charcot amphitheatre.

From 1988 to his death, Caycedo continued to develop his sophrology method in Andorra. In 1989, he created the new level of Master of Caycedian Sophrology and founded the International University of Caycedian Sophrology (Sophrocay International).

Sophrology is well-established in France, Spain, Germany, Switzerland and South America. In 2005 a sophrology centre was set up in Geneva and London to bring sophrology to the English-speaking world.

== Bibliography ==
- (in Spanish) La sofrología médica. Su aplicación a la odontología, 1961, Rev. Esp. de Estomatología, Barcelone.
- (in Spanish) Hacia un estudio fenomenológico de la Hipnosis clínica. Las técnicas de la relajación y estados afines, 1962, Rev. Lat. Amer. de Hip. Clin. vol III, n° 2, Buenos Aires.
- (in English) Sophrology and Psychosomatic Medicine, 1964, The American Journal of Clinical Hypnosis, Arizona.
- (in Spanish) Relajación Hipnosis, Yoga, Zen, fenómenos unitarios, 1965, Rev. Ibero Americana de Sofrología, Buenos Aires.
- (in English) Letters of silence, 1966, Bhawani and Sons, New-Delhi (Inde).
- (in English) India of Yogis, 1966, National Publishing House, New-Delhi (Inde).
- (in Spanish) Progresos en sofrología, 1969, Editorial Scientia, Barcelona (Spain), ouvrage collectif traduit sous le titre Progrès en sophrologie, Société centrale de sophrologie et médecine psychosomatique.
- (in Spanish) La India de los Yogis, 1971, Editorial Scientia, Barcelona.
- (in Spanish) Diccionario Abreviado de Sofrología y Relajación Dinámica
- (in French) Dictionnaire abrégé de Sophrologie et Relaxation Dynamique, 1972, ediciones Emegé, Barcelona.
- (in Spanish) Sofrología médica, 1974, ediciones Aura, Barcelona.
- (in French) L'aventure de la sophrologie, 1979, Editions Retz, Paris.
- (in French) Sophrologie Caycedienne, Relaxation Dynamique de Caycedo en 13 cassettes vidéo, 1994, Sophrocay International.
- (in French) Sophrologie Caycedienne en médecine et en prophylaxie sociale, revue officielle de la Fondation Alfonso Caycedo dirigée par A. Caycedo, depuis 1995, Sophrocay S.A., PAL (La Massana), Principauté d'Andorre.
