= ESI Group =

French software company

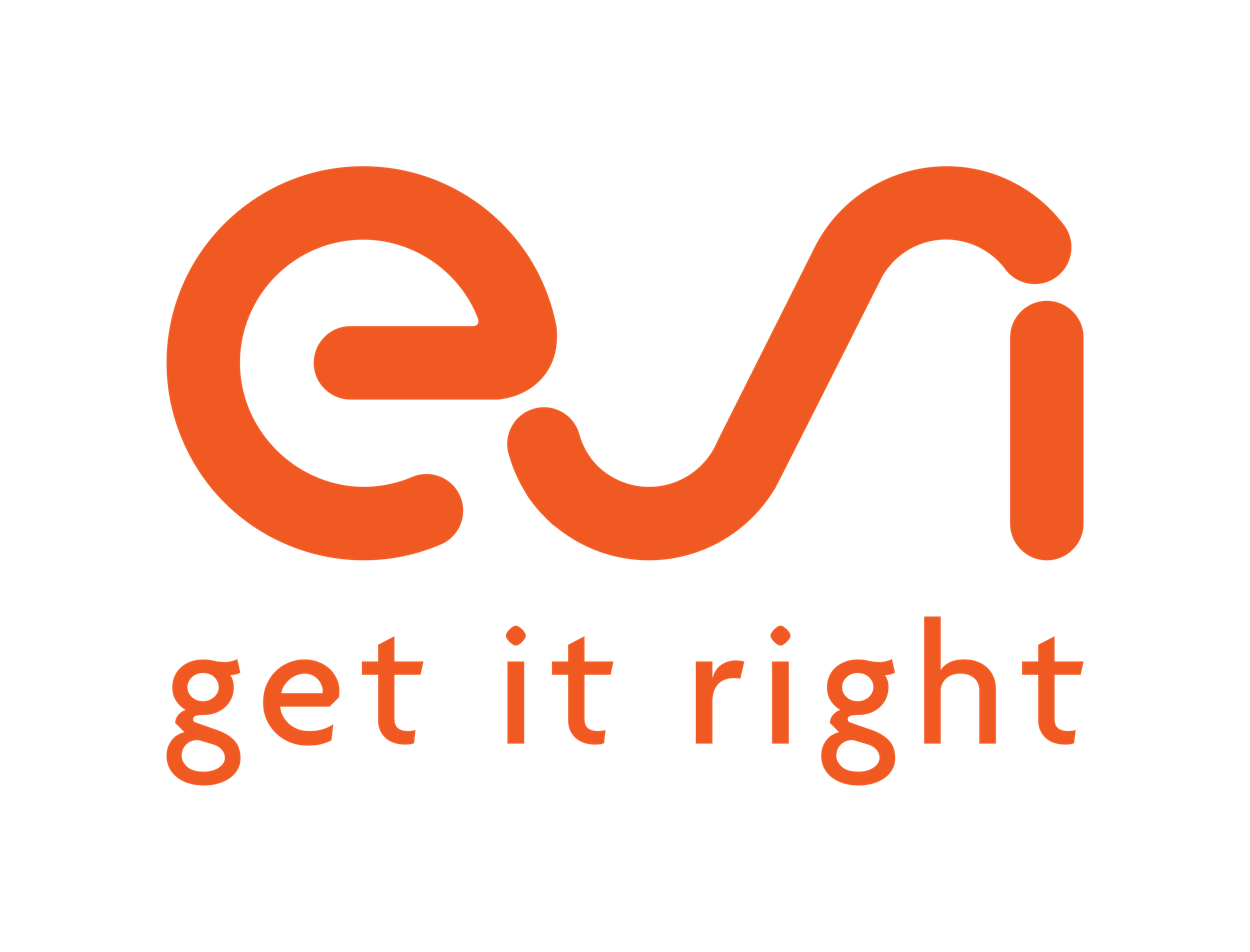
- Type: Public
- Traded as: Euronext Paris: ESI
- Industry: Computer Aided Engineering (CAE) Software
- Founded: 1973; 53 years ago
- Founder: Alain de Rouvray; Jacques Dubois; Iraj Farhoomand; Eberhard Haug
- Headquarters: Bagneux, France
- Key people: Corinne Romefort-Régnier, General Manager, Hamish Gray, Chairman
- Revenue: €130 million (2022)
- Number of employees: 1000 (2023)
- Parent: Keysight Technologies (2023–present)

ESI Group provides virtual prototyping software that simulates a product's behavior during testing, manufacturing and real-life use. Engineers in a variety of industries use its software to evaluate the performance of proposed designs in the early phases of the project with the goal of identifying and eliminating potential design flaws.

On November 3, 2023, Keysight Technologies announced that it had completed the purchase of controlling interest in the company.

== History ==
ESI (Engineering System International) was founded as Engineering Systems International in France in 1973 by Alain de Rouvray along with three other recent PhD.s from the University of California Berkeley: Jacques Dubois, Iraj Farhoomand and Eberhard Haug. The company initially operated as a consulting company for European defense, aerospace and nuclear industries.

On May 30, 1978 the company presented the simulation of an accidental crash of a military fighter plane into a nuclear power plant at a Verein Deutscher Ingenieure (VDI) meeting in Stuttgart. German automobile manufacturers then tested the applicability of several emerging commercial crash simulation codes, including what would become Pam-Crash crash simulation software. As part of this project, the software's initial version simulated the frontal impact of a full passenger car structure, a Volkswagen Polo car model, in a collision with a rigid concrete barrier at 50 km/h, in an overnight computer run. This was the first successful full-car frontal crash simulation ever performed. Finite element simulation provided accurate determination of the structural deformations while rigid body simulation was used during the relatively unimportant deformation and free-flight phases of the simulation.

In July 2000 the company issued an initial public offering that generated 30 million Euros which was used to help fund product development. In 2003 it acquired EASi's computer aided engineering (CAE) simulation design and control software environments. In 2004 the company invested $5 million in its Indian development center with plans to grow the operation to a 300-person team in the next few years. It acquired six computational fluid dynamics (CFD) analysis products including CFD-ACE+, CFD-FASTRAN, CFD-VISCART and CFD-CADalyzer from CFD Research Corp in February 2004. CFDRC software end user revenues totaled approximately $6.5 million for 2003. In December 2008 the company acquired the US CFD service provider Mindware Engineering Inc. with 70 people based in the United States, Europe and India.

The company has obtained the ISO9001 certification, is recognized by Areva with its Q-N100 and Q-N300 certifications, and by Électricité de France (EDF) with its SGAQ system. It has received France's "confidential defense" certification and obtained a specific certification from the Commissariat à l'énergie atomique (CEA – atomic energy commission).

Designer Cynthia Tripp's latest venture called Tripp's Department Store, which is powered by ESI's IC.IDO software, offers architects, designers and manufacturers the ability to construct, experience and share full-scale, immersive virtual reality models of their projects. ESI Group acquired OpenCFD, developer of open-source software OpenFOAM, from SGI in September 2012. ESI signed an agreement with Renault in May 2013 in which Renault will utilize ESI's expertise in virtual prototyping to accelerate its product development programs. In October 2013 ESI acquired CyDesign Labs which specializes in combining 0D-1D simple design tools with advanced 3D simulation.

In 2022, ESI Group began executing the “OneESI 2024 – Focus to Grow” plan. As part of this strategy, ESI Group divested the following products and technologies: ACE+ (acquired from CFD Research Corporation before 2010), Scilab (acquired in 2017), Inendi Inspector (acquired in 2015 from PicViz Labs)

In 2024, ESI Group becomes a part of Keysight Technologies, providing reliable and customized solutions anchored on predictive physics modeling and virtual prototyping expertise.

== Products ==
The Ford Motor Company used the company's virtual performance tool, Pam-Comfort software, to predict the seatback contour under occupant loading through the range of the lumbar support mechanism travel. The predicted change in seatback deflection matched up well with the measured values. Researchers at the European Space Agency (ESA) used the company's CFD-ACE+ software to simulate transpiration cooling with turbulence in the main flow and the laminar flow assumption in the porous media. High performance computing capabilities are critical in modeling porous media and the ESA used up to 48 processors in some calculations.

The company provides software for casting simulation. Frost & Sullivan's 2006 European Technology Leadership of the Year Award in digital simulation for prototyping and manufacturing processes went to the company for its ProCAST 2005 software for foundry simulation. Precision Engineering, a stamping company in Lowell, Michigan, cut die tryout cost from $18,000 to $3,600 by using the company's Pam-Stamp 2G software to simulate the drawing and forming process. Also in the field of sheet metal forming simulation, Atlas Tool used the same software to compensate for the effects of springback for high-strength and dual-phase steel for product geometry. In the aerospace sector, Vdot, a product acquired by the company in 2008, was one of four "strong points" found during a recently conducted AS9100 audit at NASA's Michoud Assembly Facility (MAF). MAF used Vdot for identifying the process and linking the customer requirements and the organization's documents in its AS9100 audit. Joe Costa, Mission Assurance Director said: "...achieving AS9100 certification in one year, starting from ground zero, was the gold ring..."

In a review of VA One, the company's vibro-acoustic simulation software, Desktop Engineering said: "VA One combines finite elements (FE), boundary elements (BEM), and statistical energy analysis (SEA) in a single model. And you can use it whenever during your design stages, so it minimizes physical prototypes, last-hour design corrections, and a ton of best-guess work. With VA One you can set up your NVH model in a few hours and have your results in minutes if not sooner."

Engineering.com reviewed ESI's IC.IDO immersive reality 3D environment.

The demo took place in a darkened room where a bright image of a 3D model is projected on one wall in life size scale. The demo pilot moved the reviewer through the plant and right up to a car. The review stated: "Andre [the demo pilot] was able to move us through the plant and right up to the car. He then walked us through the steps that an employee would go through to install a battery, ratchet in a bolt and install a gas tank. Throughout the demo he pointed out areas of possible interference between the virtual car design and the assembly process."
