= Virtual prototyping =

Computer-simulated prototype development

Virtual prototyping is a method in the process of product development. It involves using computer-aided design (CAD), computer-automated design (CAutoD) and computer-aided engineering (CAE) software to validate a design before committing to making a physical prototype. This is done by creating (usually 3D) computer generated geometrical shapes (parts) and either combining them into an "assembly" and testing different mechanical motions, fit and function. The assembly or individual parts can be opened in CAE software as digital twins to simulate the behavior of the product in the real world.

== Background ==
The product design and development process used to rely primarily on engineers' experience and judgment in producing an initial concept design. A physical prototype was then constructed and tested in order to evaluate its performance. Without any way to evaluate its performance in advance, the initial prototype was highly unlikely to meet expectations. Engineers usually had to re-design the initial concept multiple times to address weaknesses that were revealed in physical testing.

== Move towards virtual prototypes ==
Today, manufacturers are under pressure to reduce time to market and optimize products to higher levels of performance and reliability. A much higher number of products are being developed in the form of virtual prototypes in which engineering simulation software is used to predict performance prior to constructing physical prototypes. Engineers can quickly explore the performance of thousands of design alternatives without investing the time and money required to build physical prototypes. The ability to explore a wide range of design alternatives leads to improvements in performance and design quality. Yet the time required to bring the product to market is usually reduced substantially because virtual prototypes can be produced much faster than physical prototypes.

== End-to-end prototyping ==
End-to-end prototyping accounts fully for how a product or a component is manufactured and assembled, and it links the consequences of those processes to performance. Early availability of such physically realistic virtual prototypes allows testing and performance confirmation to take place as design decisions are made; enabling the acceleration of the design activity and providing more insight on the relationship between manufacturing and performance than can be achieved by building and testing physical prototypes. The benefits include reduced costs in both design and manufacturing as physical prototyping and testing is dramatically reduced/eliminated and lean but robust manufacturing processes are selected.

== Effects ==
The research firm Aberdeen Group reports that best-in-class manufacturers, who make extensive use of simulation early in the design process, hit revenue, cost, and launch date and quality targets for 86% or more of their products. Best-in-class manufacturers of the most complex products get to market 158 days earlier with $1.9 million lower costs than all other manufacturers. Best-in-class manufacturers of the simplest products get to market 21 days earlier with $21,000 fewer product development costs.

== Examples ==
Fisker Automotive used virtual prototyping to design the rear structure and other areas of its Karma plug-in hybrid to ensure the integrity of the fuel tank in a rear end crash as required for Federal Motor Vehicle Safety Standards (FMVSS) 301 certification. Agilent Technologies used virtual prototyping to design cooling systems for the calibration head for a new high-speed oscilloscope. Miele used virtual prototyping to improve the development of its washer-disinfector machines by simulating their operational characteristics early in the design cycle. Several CAE software solutions (for example, Working Model and SimWise) offer the possibility to check the benefits of virtual prototyping even for students and small companies, and collection of case studies are available since 1996.

== See also ==
- Crash simulation
- Finite element analysis
- Computer simulation
- Paper prototyping
