= LS-DYNA =

Physics simulation software package

- Screenshot from LS-PrePost showing the results of an LS-DYNA simulation of a Geo Metro impacting a rigid wall at 120 kilometres per hour (75 mph)
- Developers: LSTC (Ansys, Inc.)
- Stable release: R15.0.2 / March 2024
- Written in: Fortran
- Operating system: Microsoft Windows, Linux, Unix
- Type: Computer-aided engineering, Finite Element Analysis
- License: Proprietary commercial software (1978 DYNA3D Public domain software)
- Website: lsdyna.ansys.com

LS-DYNA is an advanced general-purpose multiphysics simulation software package developed by the former Livermore Software Technology Corporation (LSTC), which was acquired by Ansys in 2019. While the package continues to contain more and more possibilities for the calculation of many complex, real world problems, its origins and core-competency lie in highly nonlinear transient dynamic finite element analysis (FEA) using explicit time integration. LS-DYNA is used by the automobile, aerospace, construction and civil engineering, military, manufacturing, and bioengineering industries.

== History ==
LS-DYNA originated from the 3D FEA program DYNA3D, developed by Dr. John O. Hallquist at Lawrence Livermore National Laboratory (LLNL) in 1976. DYNA3D was created in order to simulate the impact of the Full Fuzing Option (FUFO) or "Dial-a-yield" nuclear bomb for low altitude release (impact velocity of ~ 40 m/s). At the time, no 3D software was available for simulating impact, and 2D software was inadequate. Though the FUFO bomb was eventually canceled, development of DYNA3D continued. DYNA3D used explicit time integration to study nonlinear dynamic problems, with the original applications being mostly stress analysis of structures undergoing various types of impacts. The program was initially very simple largely due to the lack of adequate computational resources at the time. A two-dimensional version of the same software was developed concurrently. In 1978 the DYNA3D source code was released into the public domain without restrictions after a request from France.

In 1979 a new version of DYNA3D was released which was programmed for optimal performance on the CRAY-1 supercomputers. This new release contained improved sliding interface treatment which was an order of magnitude faster than the previous contact treatment. This version also eliminated structural and higher order solid elements of the first version, while including element-wise integration of the integral difference method developed in 1974.

The 1982 release included nine additional material models which allowed for new simulations, such as explosive-structure and soil-structure interactions. The release also permitted the analysis of structural response due to penetrating projectiles. Improvements in 1982 further boosted the execution speed by about 10 percent. Hallquist was the sole developer of DYNA3D until 1984, when he was joined by Dr. David J. Benson. In 1986, many capabilities were added. The added features included beams, shells, rigid bodies, single surface contact, interface friction, discrete springs and dampers, optional hourglass treatments, optional exact volume integration, and VAX/VMS, IBM, UNIX, COS operating system compatibility. At this point, DYNA3D became the first code to have a general single surface contact algorithm.

Metal forming simulation and composite analysis capabilities were added to DYNA3D in 1987. This version included changes to the shell elements, and dynamic relaxation. The final release of DYNA3D in 1988 included several more elements and capabilities.

By 1988 LLNL had sent approximately 600 tapes containing simulation software. Hallquist had consulted for nearly 60 companies and organizations on the use of DYNA3D. As a result, at the end of 1988 Livermore Software Technology Corporation (LSTC) was founded to continue the development of DYNA3D in a much more focused manner, resulting in LS-DYNA3D (later shortened to LS-DYNA). Releases and support for DYNA3D were thus halted. Since then, LSTC has greatly expanded the capabilities of LS-DYNA in an attempt to create a universal tool for most simulation needs.

In 2019, LSTC was acquired by Ansys, Inc.

== Typical uses ==
Nonlinear means at least one (and sometimes all) of the following complications:

- Changing boundary conditions (such as contact between parts that changes over time)
- Large deformations (for example the crumpling of sheet metal parts)
- Nonlinear materials that do not exhibit ideally elastic behavior (for example thermoplastic polymers)

Transient dynamic means analyzing high speed, short duration events where inertial forces are important. Typical uses include:

- Automotive crash (deformation of chassis, airbag inflation, seatbelt tensioning, ...)
- Explosions (underwater mines, shaped charges, ...)
- Manufacturing (sheet metal stamping, ...)

== Characteristics ==
LS-DYNA consists of a single executable file and is entirely command-line driven. Therefore, all that is required to run LS-DYNA (besides some licensing infrastructure) is a command shell, the appropriate executable for the computer's architecture, an input file, and enough free disk space to store the results. Input files use a simple ASCII format and thus can be prepared using any text editor. Many third-party simulation environments integrate some LS-DYNA preprocessing capabilities. LSTC also develops its own preprocessor, LS-PrePost, which is freely distributed, runs without a license, and can also be used for viewing and postprocessing simulation results. Licensees of LS-DYNA automatically have access to all of the program's capabilities, from simple linear static mechanical analysis up to advanced thermal and flow solving methods. Furthermore, they have full use of LSTC's LS-OPT software, a standalone design optimization and probabilistic analysis package with an interface to LS-DYNA.

=== Capabilities ===
LS-DYNA's potential applications are numerous and can be used in many fields. LS-DYNA is not limited to any particular type of simulation. In a given simulation, any of LS-DYNA's many features can be combined to model a wide variety of physical events. However the main strength of the software lies in highly nonlinear simulations of high-speed events, preferably involving the deformation of sheet metal. (For example a car crashing into a traffic barrier.) Several variants of algorithms and multiphysics expansions were added to use these core capabilities in special fields. (For example the deep drawing of steel sheets by electromagnetic forces or by explosives.)

One example of a simulation that involved a unique combination of several features is the NASA JPL Mars Pathfinder landing, which simulated the gas and fabric of inflating airbags around the spaceship, and the subsequent impact and bouncing of the assembly on the martian soil.

LS-DYNA's analysis capabilities:

- Full 2D & 3D capabilities
- Nonlinear dynamics
- Rigid body dynamics
- Quasi-static simulations
- Normal modes
- Linear statics
- Thermal analysis
- Fluid analysis
  - Eulerian capabilities
  - ALE (Arbitrary Lagrangian-Eulerian)
  - FSI (Fluid-Structure Interaction)
  - Navier-Stokes fluids
  - Compressible fluid solver, CESE (Conservation Element & Solution Element)
- FEM-rigid multi-body dynamics coupling (MADYMO, Cal3D)
- Underwater shock
- Failure analysis
- Crack propagation
- Real-time acoustics
- Implicit springback
- Multi-physics coupling
- Structural-thermal coupling
- Adaptive remeshing
- SPH (Smoothed particle hydrodynamics)
- DEM (Discrete element method)
- EFG (Element Free Galerkin)
- Radiation transport
- EM (Electromagnetism)

=== Material Library ===
LS-DYNA's comprehensive library of material models:

- Metals
- Plastics
- Glass
- Foams
- Fabrics
- Elastomers
- Honeycombs
- Concrete & soils
- Viscous fluids
- User-defined materials

=== Element Library ===
Some of the element types available in LS-DYNA:

- Beams (standard, trusses, discrete, cables, and welds) (with over 10 beam element formulations)
- Discrete Elements (Springs and Dampers)
- Lumped Inertias
- Lumped Masses
- Accelerometers
- Sensors
- Seat Belts
  - Pretensioners
  - Retractors
  - Sliprings
- Shells (3, 4, 6, and 8-node including 3D shells, membranes, 2D plane stress, plane strain, and axisymmetric solids) (with over 25 shell element formulations)
- Solids (4 and 10-node tetrahedrons, 6-node pentahedrons, and 8-node hexahedrons) (with over 20 solid element formulations)
- SPH Elements
- Thick Shells (8-node)

=== Contact Algorithms ===
LS-DYNA's contact algorithms:

- Flexible body contact
- Flexible body to rigid body contact
- Rigid body to rigid body contact
- Edge-to-edge contact
- Eroding contact
- Tied surfaces
- CAD surfaces
- Rigid walls
- Draw beads

== Applications ==
=== Automotive crashworthiness & occupant safety ===
LS-DYNA is used by the automotive industry to analyze vehicle designs. LS-DYNA accurately predicts a car's behavior in a collision and the effects of the collision upon the car's occupants. With LS-DYNA, automotive companies and their suppliers can test car designs without having to tool or experimentally test a prototype, thus saving time and expense.

LS-DYNA's specialized automotive features:

- Seatbelts
- Slip rings
- Pretensioners
- Retractors
- Sensors
- Accelerometers
- Airbags
- Hybrid III dummy models
- Inflator models

=== Sheetmetal forming with LS-DYNA ===
One of LS-DYNA's applications is sheetmetal forming. LS-DYNA accurately predicts the stresses and deformations experienced by the metal, and determines if the metal will fail. LS-DYNA supports adaptive remeshing and will refine the mesh during the analysis, as necessary, to increase accuracy and save time.

Metal forming applications for LS-DYNA include:

- Metal stamping
- Hydroforming
- Forging
- Deep drawing
- Multi-stage processes

=== Aerospace industry applications ===
LS-DYNA is used by the aerospace industry to simulate bird strike, jet engine blade containment, and structural failure.

Aerospace applications for LS-DYNA include:

- Blade containment
- Bird strike (windshield, and engine blade)
- Failure analysis

=== Military and defense applications ===
LS-DYNA is used extensively by researchers from military and defense. Some of these applications include:

- Explosions (underwater Naval mine, shaped charges)
- Projectile Penetration
- Rail Gun
- Warhead Design
- Shockwave modelling

=== Oil and gas industry ===
LS-DYNA is used in oil and gas industries to perform fatigue analysis on offshore structures, failure analysis of ships under the event of collision, and simulate fluid structure interactions. LS-DYNA applications for oil and gas industry include:

- Jacket Platform Analysis
- Sloshing Analysis
- Ice Impact
- Wave and Tsunami Impact

=== Other applications ===
Other LS-DYNA applications include:

- Drop testing
- Can and shipping container design
- Electronic component design
- Glass forming
- Plastics, mold, and blow forming
- Biomedical (heart valves)
- Metal cutting
- Earthquake engineering
- Failure analysis
- Sports equipment (golf clubs, golf balls, baseball bats, helmets)
- Civil engineering (offshore platforms, pavement design)
