= MADYMO =

- Operating system: Linux and Microsoft Windows
- Type: multi-body system simulation
- License: proprietary
- Website: www.tassinternational.com/madymo

MADYMO (MAthematical DYnamic MOdels) is a software package for the analysis of occupant safety systems in the automotive and transport industries. The software was developed by the Netherlands Organization for Applied Scientific Research (TNO) and is owned and distributed by TASS International Software and Services, headquartered in Helmond, the Netherlands. By one author's estimation, "MADYMO is probably the most widely used multi-body system program for occupant safety systems."

Application areas include automotive crash safety, train interior safety, motorcycle safety, aircraft and helicopter safety, consumer product safety, crash reconstruction, and vehicle handling.

== Product modules ==
MADYMO has a range of product modules with different functionality

- MADYMO/Solver - The MADYMO simulation engine which includes Multi-body, Finite Element and Computational Fluid Dynamics capabilities to drive the simulation of occupant restraint systems as well as the MADYMO dummy models and MADYMO Human models.
- MADYMO/XMADgic - A Pre-processor for MADYMO. It is a XML-editor with dedicated functionality to support you in editing an XMLinput deck for the MADYMO solver. The editor fully complies with the XML standard.
- MADYMO/MADpost - MADPost is a multi-platform post processor for the MADYMO solver. It has been designed to facilitate optimal use of the MADYMO solver output – both for viewing animations and creating time-history plots. MADPost also supports import and display of some foreign FE code output formats and physical test data formats, such as video formats and ISO formatted data.
- MADYMO/Exchange - MADYMO/Exchange is a MADYMO/Workspace tool that automates and simplifies the use of the MADYMO software, allowing controlled model modification and controlled exchange of components, such that a consistent and efficient MADYMO modelling process is achieved. MADYMO/Exchange consists of a GUI that guides the user step-by-step through the modelling tasks. All steps are represented in the GUI via individual tabs.
- MADYMO/Exchange Assistant - MADYMO/Exchange Assistant is an authoring tool for the Exchange super-user, allowing controlled model modification and controlled exchange of components such that a consistent and efficient MADYMO modelling process is achieved. It helps the super-user in defining the component definitions, the analysis type file and the project file
- MADYMO/Objective Rating - The objective rating tool provides the user with a means to rate pairs of curves against each other, based on a set of predefined rating criteria and hence provides an immediate overview of how well signals correlate, indicated by colours and values. The user can define a rating matrix and save this as a template that can be reloaded in a later stage, either in GUI or in batch mode.
- MADYMO/Protocol Rating - The protocol rating tool calculates and presents occupant safety ratings according to different vehicle safety assessment protocols. The tool allows for directly importing input data (injury criteria values) from MADYMO peak file output. Alternatively the user can fill and modify injury criteria and input other values manually
- MADYMO/Converter - Converter is a flexible foreign-code-to-MADYMO-code converter. Due to the use of Perl as converter language, the converter can be easily enhanced by adding new scripts. The tool has its own GUI and can be used stand-alone and/or in combination with XMADgic4.0 and onwards.
- Coupling/Assistant - The Coupling Assistant is introduced to enable users of FE codes as PAM-CRASH, RADIOSS and DYNA to work with MADYMO Dummies and MADYMO models in general. There is no need to know the MADYMO input format as the Coupling Assistant completely hides it from the user.

== Product features ==
- Fast & accurate simulations
- Accurate crash dummy & human body models
- State-of-the-art restraint system modelling techniques
- Reliable predictions of safety performance & injury risks
- Multibody, Finite Element & CFD combined in one code
