= Regulation of self-driving cars =

Legislation and standards for self-driving cars and related technologies

Regulation of self-driving cars refers to legislation passed in various jurisdictions around the world to regulate, standardise, test and monitor the use of autonomous vehicles and automated driving systems on public roads. Existing liability laws are also evolving to fairly identify the parties responsible for damage and injury, and to address the potential for conflicts of interest between human occupants, system operators, insurers, and the public purse. Autonomous vehicle regulations may also apply to robotaxis and self-driving trucks, depending upon local legislation.

In June 2011, the US state of Nevada became the first jurisdiction in the world to legislate for self-driving. Since then, many state, national and supranational bodies have introduced similar laws with varying characteristics. Regulations governing the testing of automated cars on public roads (as opposed to full consumer operations) include those introduced by the government of the United Kingdom in 2013, with similar laws coming into effect in France in 2015.

Modification of existing international agreements on the use of vehicles on public roads has also taken place. The 1949 Vienna Geneva Convention on Road Traffic had assumed that a driver is always fully in control and responsible for the behaviour of a vehicle in traffic, but this was amended in 2016 to allow the possibility of automated features in vehicles.

Specific international regulations also began to be formulated in 2018 with the Working Party on Automated/Autonomous and Connected Vehicles (GRVA) recommending safety provisions related to the dynamics of vehicles (braking, steering), Advanced Driver Assistance Systems, Automated Driving Systems (ADS) and cyber security provisions for the World Forum for Harmonization of Vehicle Regulations (WP.29).

Individual jurisdictions around the world have also set up legal frameworks of various kinds. China introduced testing regulations for autonomous cars in 2018, and in 2020 issued the "Strategy for Innovation and Development of Intelligent Vehicles", a roadmap plan until 2025 relating to road traffic safety, surveying and mapping laws relating to intelligent vehicles. In Europe, Regulation 2019/2144, commonly known as the General Safety Regulation (GSR), came into force for all new cars in the European Union after 6th July 2022. Similar legislation followed in Japan with the law modified to reflect the finalized UNECE WP.29 GRVA regulations. In some cases regulations for fully manual cars have created unintended regulatory barriers for self-driving cars.

SAE wording is generally adopted as the de facto standard for definitions in regulations throughout most jurisdictions. This gives descriptions for levels of autonomy ranging from fully manual (Level 0) to fully automated (Level 5). Terminology in ADS, Operational Design Domain (ODD) and Dynamic Driving Task (DDT) is also used.

== General considerations ==
Most regulations aim to achieve compatibility of automated vehicles with safety, legal responsibility, privacy and public expectations. The United Nations Economic Commission (UNEC) for Europe considers a balanced regulatory framework as a prerequisite to the mass introduction of these automated vehicles on the road. A primary aim is also to ensure that diverse vehicles work in their operating constraints and that drivers understand the vehicle capabilities for its safe usage.

Self-driving car liability is also a developing area of law and policy that will determine who is liable when an automated car causes physical damage to persons, or breaks road rules. When automated cars shift the control of driving from humans to automated car technology, the driver may need to consent to share operational responsibility, which will require a legal framework. There may also be a need for existing liability laws to evolve to fairly identify the parties responsible for damage and injury, and to address the potential for conflicts of interest between human occupants, system operators, insurers, and the public purse.

== International agreements ==
There is no unique and fully harmonised regulatory framework applicable worldwide for the certification of vehicles as some countries rely on self certification and others rely on type-approval. International agreements act as the global "blueprint" for vehicle safety, while national laws act as the "rulebook" for how those vehicles are used on the street.

=== Conventions on Road Traffic ===
The Geneva Convention on Road Traffic is an international treaty promoting the development and safety of international road traffic by establishing certain uniform rules among the contracting parties. The convention addresses minimum mechanical and safety equipment needed to be on board and defines an identification mark to identify the origin of the vehicle. The Convention was prepared and opened for signature by the United Nations Conference on Road and Motor Transport held at Geneva from 23 August to 19 September 1949. It came into force on 26 March 1952. This conference also produced the Protocol on Road Signs and Signals.

One of the fundamental principles of the convention had been that a driver is always fully in control and responsible for the behaviour of a vehicle in traffic. In 2016, a reform of the convention opened the possibility for automated features in vehicles so that driving tasks could be transferred to the vehicle in traffic. By 14 January 2022, the amendment to the convention was accepted, entering into force on 14 July 2022.

=== UNECE WP.29 GRVA ===
In February 2018, the United Nations Economic Commission for Europe (UNECE)'s Inland Transport Committee (ITC) acknowledged the importance of the World Forum for Harmonization of Vehicle Regulations (WP.29) activities related to automated, autonomous and connected vehicles. They requested WP.29 to consider establishing a dedicated Working Party and at the June 2018 session, converted the Working Party on Brakes and Running Gear (GRRF) into a new Working Party on Automated/Autonomous and Connected Vehicles (GRVA). The group deals with safety provisions related to the dynamics of vehicles (braking, steering), Advanced Driver Assistance Systems, Automated Driving Systems and well as cyber security provisions.

In June 2020, the WP.29 virtual meeting approved reports from GRVA about its fifth session on "automated/autonomous and connected vehicles" and sixth session on "cyber security and software updates". The new Regulation on cyber security has been allocated as Regulation 155, and the new Regulation on software updates has been allocated as Regulation 156. In this way, UN regulation on SAE Level 3 was established.

In March 2021, the following UNECE regulations were published:

- Regulation 155: Cyber security and cyber security management system
- Regulation 156: Software update and software update management system
- Regulation 157: Automated Lane Keeping Systems (ALKS)

In June 2022, the 187th session of WP.29 was held, and several amendments on GRVA regulations were agreed to. An amendment to UN Regulation Number 157 updated the regulations regarding Automated Lane Keeping Systems (ALKS), increasing the allowed speed limit of 60 km/h (37 mph) to 130 km/h (81 mph) and added rules for automated lane change functions in passenger vehicles.

A new global technical regulation has also been proposed based on the accepted Proposal to develop a new UN GTR on Automated Driving Systems submitted by the representatives of Canada, China, the European Union, Japan, the United Kingdom of Great Britain and Northern Ireland and the United States of America for the generation of the draft UN Global Technical Regulation on ADS. As of 2024, this regulation is still under development.

=== European Union ===
In November 2019, Regulation (EU) 2019/2144 of the European Parliament and of the Council on motor vehicle type approval requirements defined specific requirements relating to automated vehicles and fully automated vehicles. This law is applicable from 2022 and is based on uniform procedures and technical specifications for the systems and other items.

In April 2022, EU released a draft version of its legislation for vehicles with automated driving systems (ADS), officially adopted in February 2024.

In July 2022, the new "Vehicle General Safety Regulation" come into effect which establishes the legal framework for the approval of automated and fully driverless vehicles (Level 3 and above) in the EU. And the EU introduced regulations which require all new cars from 6 July 2022 to be fitted with intelligent speed assistance (ISA) (Level 2).

EU Commission delegated regulation contains specific requirements for specific vehicles with regulatory differences between:

- Fully automated vehicles of categories N1, N2 and N3 without driver seat and without occupants
- Fully automated vehicles of categories N1, N2, N3, M1, M2, M3 without driver seat, with occupants
- Dual mode vehicles: vehicles with a driver seat designed and constructed to be driven by the driver in the “manual driving mode” and to be driven by the automated driving system (ADS) without any driver supervision in the “fully automated driving mode”

Automated vehicles deployment is addressed by several European regulations:

- Regulation (EU) 2018/858
- Regulation (EU) 2019/2144
- Regulation (EU) 2022/2236
- Regulation (EU) 2022/1426

== Legislation in the United States ==
In the United States, a non-signatory country to the Vienna Convention, state vehicle codes historically did not envisage—but did not necessarily prohibit—highly automated vehicles. To clarify the legal status of and regulate such vehicles, many states have enacted specific laws regarding autonomous vehicles.

In 2017, the Republican-controlled House of Representatives unanimously passed "SELF DRIVE Act" which would speed the adoption of self-driving cars and bar states from setting performance standards. However, a complementary bill in the Senate, "AV START", failed to pass after Democrats raised objections that it didn't do enough to address safety and liability concerns. A comprehensive regulatory structure has not yet emerged at either the federal or state level in the United States.

In August 2022, members of the United States House of Representatives launched a bipartisan effort to help revive legislative efforts to boost self-driving vehicles.

=== Federal policies ===
In September 2016, the US National Economic Council and US Department of Transportation (USDOT) released the Federal Automated Vehicles Policy, which are standards that describe how automated vehicles should react if their technology fails, how to protect passenger privacy, and how riders should be protected in the event of an accident. The new federal guidelines are meant to avoid a patchwork of state laws, while avoiding being so overbearing as to stifle innovation. Since then, USDOT has released multiple updates:

- Automated Driving Systems: A Vision for Safety 2.0 (12 September 2017)
- Preparing for the Future of Transportation: Automated Vehicles 3.0 (4 October 2018)
- Ensuring American Leadership in Automated Vehicle Technologies: Automated Vehicles 4.0 (8 January 2020)

The National Highway Traffic Safety Administration (NHTSA) released for public comment the Occupant Protection for Automated Driving System on 30 March 2020, followed by the Framework for Automated Driving System Safety on 3 December 2020. Occupant Protection is intended to modernize the Federal Motor Vehicle Safety Standards considering the removal of manual controls with automated driving systems, while the Framework document is intended to provide an objective way to define and assess automated driving system competence to ensure motor vehicle safety while also remaining flexible to accommodate the development of features to improve safety.

Historically, a vehicle without driving controls such as a steering wheel, accelerator pedal, and brake pedal would not be in compliance with the Federal Motor Vehicle Safety Standards (FMVSS), the minimum safety equipment needed to legally sell a vehicle to the public. On 10 March 2022, NHTSA updated and finalized the rule on safety requirements for the Occupant Protection to allow a vehicle without driving controls to comply with US regulations. The major update to NHTSA regulations allows companies to build and deploy autonomous vehicles without manual controls, as long as they meet other state and federal standards.

In April 2025, crash reporting rules for Level 2 assisted cars were relaxed by the NHTSA. Incidents no longer need to be reported to the NHTSA as long as they do not involve a death, an individual being transported to a hospital for medical treatment, a pedestrian or other vulnerable road user being struck, or an airbag deployment.

=== State policies ===
As of December 2024, about half the US states had statutes regulating vehicles operated by some degree of autonomous technology.

==== Nevada ====
In June 2011, the Nevada Legislature passed a law to authorize the use of automated cars. Nevada thus became the first jurisdiction in the world where automated vehicles might be legally operated on public roads. According to the law, the Nevada Department of Motor Vehicles is responsible for setting safety and performance standards and the agency is responsible for designating areas where automated cars may be tested. This legislation was supported by Google in an effort to legally conduct further testing of its Google driverless car. The Nevada law defines an automated vehicle to be "a motor vehicle that uses artificial intelligence, sensors and global positioning system coordinates to drive itself without the active intervention of a human operator". The law also acknowledges that the operator will not need to pay attention while the car is operating itself. Google had further lobbied for an exemption from a ban on distracted driving to permit occupants to send text messages while sitting behind the wheel, but this did not become law. Furthermore, Nevada's regulations require a person behind the wheel and one in the passenger's seat during tests.

==== Florida ====
In April 2012, Florida became the second state to allow the testing of automated cars on public roads.

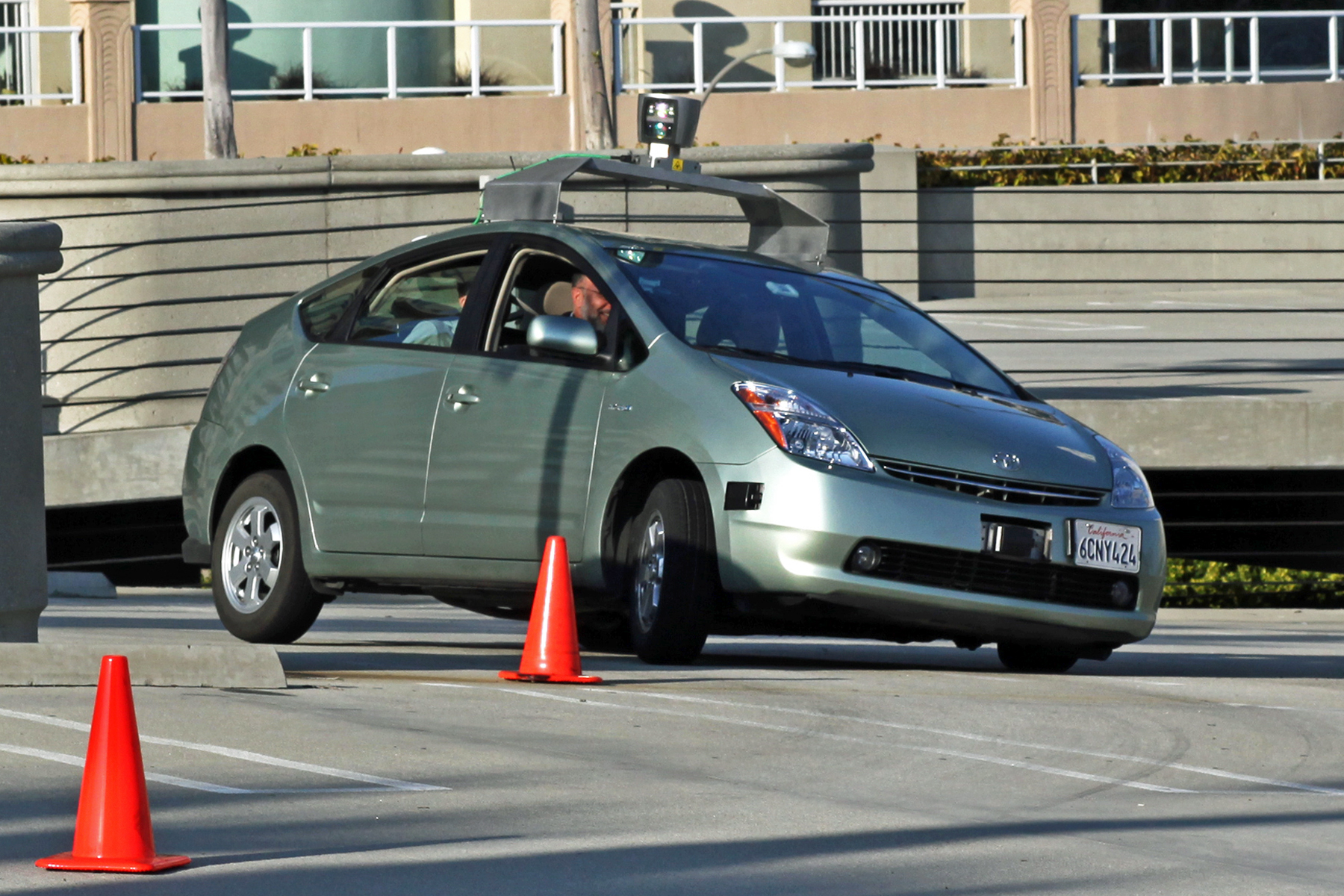
A Toyota Prius modified by Google to operate as a driverless car

==== California ====
California became the third state to allow automated car testing when Governor Jerry Brown signed SB 1298 into law in September 2012 at Google Headquarters in Mountain View.

On 19 February 2016, California Assembly Bill 2866 was introduced in California. It would allow automated vehicles to operate on public roads, including those without a driver, steering wheel, accelerator pedal, or brake pedal. The bill states that the California Department of Motor Vehicles would need to comply with these regulations by 1 July 2018 for these rules to take effect. As of November 2016, this bill has yet to pass the house of origin. California published discussions on the proposed federal automated vehicles policy in October 2016.

In December 2016, the California Department of Motor Vehicles ordered Uber to remove its self-driving vehicles from the road in response to two red-light violations. Uber immediately blamed the violations on human error, and has suspended the drivers.

California provides permits for testing and deploying autonomous vehicles on public roads. The first manufacturer licensed to deploy autonomous cars without a safety driver by the California DMV was Nuro, on December 23, 2020. Two more manufacturers, Cruise and Waymo, were licensed on September 30, 2021.

==== Massachusetts ====
Under the governorship of Charlie Baker in 2016, Executive Order 572 was implemented to promote the testing of autonomous vehicles on public roads in Massachusetts. The order also give directive of implementation of a Working Group on the topic and a directive for the Commonwealth's transportation authority MassDOT to begin an action process to work alongside the overall industry.

==== Washington, DC ====
In Washington, DC's district code:

"Autonomous vehicle" means a vehicle capable of navigating District roadways and interpreting traffic-control devices without a driver actively operating any of the vehicle's control systems. The term "autonomous vehicle" excludes a motor vehicle enabled with active safety systems or driver- assistance systems, including systems to provide electronic blind-spot assistance, crash avoidance, emergency braking, parking assistance, adaptive cruise control, lane-keep assistance, lane-departure warning, or traffic-jam and queuing assistance, unless the system alone or in combination with other systems enables the vehicle on which the technology is installed to drive without active control or monitoring by a human operator.

In the same district code, it is considered that:

An autonomous vehicle may operate on a public roadway; provided, that the vehicle:

- (1) Has a manual override feature that allows a driver to assume control of the autonomous vehicle at any time;
- (2) Has a driver seated in the control seat of the vehicle while in operation who is prepared to take control of the autonomous vehicle at any moment; and
- (3) Is capable of operating in compliance with the District's applicable traffic laws and motor vehicle laws and traffic control devices.

==== Texas ====
In 2017, Texas enacted Senate Bill 2205, establishing a framework for the operation of automated motor vehicles on public roads. The law preempted local regulation of automated motor vehicles and automated driving systems.

In 2025, Senate Bill 2807 introduced a state authorization requirement for the commercial operation of automated motor vehicles without a human driver. The legislation took effect on September 1, 2025, with the authorization requirement becoming enforceable on May 28, 2026, following the adoption of implementing rules. The Texas Department of Motor Vehicles administers the authorization program, while the Texas Department of Public Safety and local law enforcement retain responsibility for enforcing traffic laws.

Applicants must certify that their vehicles meet applicable legal, registration, insurance, and recording-device requirements and can achieve a minimal-risk condition following an automated-driving-system failure. They must also certify that an emergency-response interaction plan has been submitted to the Department of Public Safety. The Department of Motor Vehicles may restrict, suspend, or revoke operating authorizations in response to qualifying public-safety concerns.

==== Michigan and others ====
In December 2013, Michigan became the fourth state to allow testing of driverless cars on public roads. In July 2014, the city of Coeur d'Alene, Idaho adopted a robotics ordinance that includes provisions to allow for self-driving cars.

== Legislation in Europe ==
=== France ===
France is a signatory country to the Vienna Convention on road traffic and also member of the 1958 UNECE agreement and of the European union.

In 2014, the government of France announced that testing of automated cars on public roads would be allowed in 2015. 2,000 km (1,200 mi) of road would be opened through the national territory, especially in Bordeaux, in Isère, Île-de-France and Strasbourg. At the 2015 ITS World Congress, a conference dedicated to intelligent transport systems, the very first demonstration of automated vehicles on open road in France was carried out in Bordeaux in early October 2015.

In May 2018, the government published the first version of the French strategy for the development of automated road mobility to set up the legislative framework, and it brought a result as "The Mobility Orientation Law" in December 2019.

In December 2020, the government updated the strategy to make France the preferred location in Europe for the deployment of automated road mobility services.

The legislative and regulatory framework for the deployment of automated vehicles and transport systems was established through an ordinance in April 2021 and a following decree in June 2021. The legislative and regulatory framework for the operation of automated vehicles resulting from article 31 of "the Mobility Orientation Law" is scheduled to be finalized in Q1 of 2022.

=== United Kingdom ===
In 2013, the government of the United Kingdom permitted the testing of automated cars on public roads. Before this, all testing of robotic vehicles in the UK had been conducted on private property.

In July 2018, "The Automated and Electric Vehicles Act 2018" received royal assent.

In March 2019, the UK became a signatory country to the Vienna Convention.

In 2021, the UK worked on a bill to allow self-driving automated lane keeping systems (ALKS) up to 37 mph (or 60 km/h) after a mixed reaction of experts during the consultation launched in summer 2020. This system would be allowed to give back control to the driver when "unplanned events" such as road construction or inclement weather occurs. The Centre for Connected and Autonomous Vehicles (CCAV) has asked the Law Commission of England and Wales and the Scottish Law Commission to undertake a far-reaching review of the legal framework for "automated" vehicles, and their use as part of public transport networks and on-demand passenger services. The teams developed policy and the full analysis report was published in January 2022.

About misleading representation in marketing, the Society of Motor Manufacturers and Traders (SMMT) published guiding principles as followings:

1. An automated driving feature must be described sufficiently clearly so as not to mislead, including setting out the circumstances in which that feature can function.
2. An automated driving feature must be described sufficiently clearly so that it is distinguished from an assisted driving feature.
3. Where both automated driving and assisted driving features are described, they must be clearly distinguished from each other.
4. An assisted driving feature should not be described in a way that could convey the impression that it is an automated driving feature.
5. The name of an automated or assisted driving feature must not mislead by conveying that it is the other – ancillary words may be necessary to avoid confusion – for example for an assisted driving feature, by making it clear that the driver must be in control at all times.

In April 2022, UK government confirmed planned changes to The Highway Code, responding to a public consultation. The changes will clarify drivers' responsibilities in self-driving vehicles, including when a driver must be ready to take back control. In August of that year, the UK government unveiled a plan to roll out self-driving vehicles on UK roads.

In 2022, page 4 of the Highway Code states that:

By self-driving vehicles, we mean those listed as automated vehicles by the Secretary of State for Transport under the Automated and Electric Vehicles Act 2018.

In May 2024 the Automated Vehicles Act 2024 received royal assent. The act was upon the joint recommendations in the 2022 joint report from the Law Commission and Scottish Law Commission.

=== Germany ===
Germany is a signatory country to the Vienna Convention. In July 2021, the "Federal Act Amending the Road Traffic Act and the Compulsory Insurance Act" came into effect. The Act allows motor vehicles with autonomous driving capabilities, meaning vehicles that can perform driving tasks independently without a person driving, in specified operating areas on public roads. Provisions about autonomous driving in appropriate operating areas correspond to Level 4. Moreover, the new German legislation has major implications for dilemmatic situations. This includes for example the non-discrimination principle that applies to unavoidable crash situations. Moreover, the act elaborates on the technical requirements of autonomous vehicles, including a software system that can operate without permanent supervision of the technical oversight or driver, contains an accident mitigation and reduction system and can initiate a “minimal-risk state.”

In February 2022, the Federal Ministry for Digital and Transport (BMDV) submitted the "Ordinance on the Approval and Operation of Motor Vehicles with Autonomous Driving Functions in Specified Operating Areas - Autonomous Vehicles Approval and Operation Ordinance (AFGBV)" to the German Bundesrat for approval.

=== Switzerland ===
Switzerland is a signatory country to the Vienna Convention.

On December 13 2024, Switzerland defined the ordonnance sur la conduite automatisée'. According to article 53, this ordonnance should enter into force on 1 march 2025.

=== Norway ===
In December 2017, the Norwegian Parliament passed the Act Relating to Testing of Self-driving Vehicles. The Act was implemented in 2018 and allows interested parties to test self-driving vehicles on public roads.

== Legislation in North America ==
=== Canada ===
Canada is a non-signatory country to the Vienna Convention. At the federal level, "The Motor Vehicle Safety Act" regulates about motor vehicles which was last amended in February 2020.

In August 2021, Transport Canada released the "Guidelines for Testing Automated Driving Systems in Canada" Version 2.0.

Effective April 5, 2024, the province of British Columbia edited the Motor Vehicle Act to "protect vulnerable road users" which includes a section that makes it an offense to "drive or permit the driving" of automated vehicles at Level 3 automation or above. Maximum penalties go up to a $2000 fine and 6 months imprisonment. The law allows for exemptions through provincially approved pilot projects.

== Legislation in Asia ==
=== China ===
For historical reason, China is not a signatory country to 1949 Geneva Convention, although it is a signatory country to 1968 Vienna Convention.

In 2018, China introduced testing regulations to regulate autonomous cars, for conditional automation, high-level automation and full automation (roughly corresponding to Level 3, Level 4 and Level 5). The rules lay out requirements that vehicles must first be tested in non-public zones, that road tests can only be on designated streets and that a qualified person must always sit in the driver's position, ready to take over control.

In February 2020, eleven constituent departments, represented by National Development and Reform Commission (NDRC), jointly issued the "Strategy for Innovation and Development of Intelligent Vehicles" which describes about roadmap plan until 2025. This plan states about the need to revise the "Road Traffic Safety Law", and surveying and mapping law for intelligent vehicles.

In March 2020, Ministry of Industry and Information Technology (MIIT) published draft GB/T on a 6 level classification framework for driving automation which is basically corresponding to SEA levels. And in April 2020, MIIT released about the goal of the year which is set to complete the formulation of framework for driving-assist functions and low-level autonomous driving (Level 3). In January 2021, MIIT planned to add highways to the list of roads where provincial and city-level authorities can authorize automated cars.

In March 2021, Ministry of Public Security (MPS) published draft proposed amendments on the "Road Traffic Safety Law". In August 2021, The Cyberspace Administration of China (CAC) and MIIT issued "the Provisions on Management of Automotive Data Security (Trial)".

In February 2022, MIIT issued the second draft of the "Administrative Measures for Data Security in the Industry and Information Technology Fields". And in March 2022, MIIT issued "the Guidelines for the Construction of the Internet of Vehicles Cybersecurity and Data Security Standard System".

In April 2025, China introduced new reguations banning over-the-air updates to vehicles without regulatory approval, as well as bans on misleading use of advertising terms for assisted driving features.

=== Japan ===
Japan is a non-signatory country to the Vienna Convention. In 2019, Japan amended two laws, "Road Traffic Act" and "Road Transport Vehicle Act", and they came into effect in April 2020. In the former act, Level 3 self driving cars became allowed on public roads. In the latter act, process to designate types for safety certification on Level 3 self driving function of Autonomous Driving System (ADS) and the certification process for the asserted type were legally defined. Through the amendment process, the achievements from the national project "SIP-adus" led by Cabinet Office since 2014 were fully considered and accepted.

In May 2020, "The Road Act" was also amended to include definition of automatic operation control equipment in infrastructure, and came into effect. In July 2020, the next stage national level roadmap plan was officially issued which had considered social deployment and acceptability of Level 4. At the end of 2020, Ministry of Land, Infrastructure, Transport and Tourism (MLIT) amended its "Safety Regulation for Road Transport Vehicle" to reflect the finalized UNECE WP.29 GRVA's regulations consistently without delay.

In April 2021, National Police Agency (NPA) published its expert committee's report of FY 2020 on summary of issues in research to realize Level 4 mobility services, including required legal amendment issues. During the summer of 2021, Ministry of Economy, Trade and Industry (METI) prepared with MLIT to launch a project "RoAD to the L4" to cover R&D with social deployment to realize acceptable Level 4 mobility service, and updated its public information in September. As a part of this project, civil law liability problem reflecting changed roles will be clarified.

About misleading representation in marketing, Article 5 of "Act against Unjustifiable Premiums and Misleading Representations" is applied.

At the end of 2021, NPA proposed an amendment bill on "Road Traffic Act" to include approving scheme for Level 4 services. In March 2022, the Japanese government adopted the bill to amend the act. In April 2022, the bill was deliberated at the ordinary National Diet session and passed. Under the amended act, a license system was to be introduced for operators of transport services using unmanned Level 4 vehicles, which requires no driver in the remotely monitored vehicle within a limited area. Such vehicles are expected to be used for residents in depopulated areas. In October 2022, NPA unveiled their plan to make the amended "Road Traffic Act" into effect in April 2023, and on 20 December 2022, Japan's cabinet decided to allow Level 4 self-driving cars to be used for transit and delivery services from 1 April 2023.

On 1 April 2023, the amended "Road Traffic Act" was enforced. The government has a target of realizing Level 4 transport services in at least 40 locations by fiscal 2025.

== Legislation in Oceania ==
=== Australia ===
Australia is a non-signatory country to the Vienna Convention. National Transport Commission (NTC) is in charge of reforming current laws with still achieving national level consistency. In February 2022, NTC published a policy paper to present proposals on the end-to-end regulatory framework for the commercial deployment of automated vehicles.

Department of Infrastructure, Transport, Regional Development and Communications (DITRDC) is in charge of developing their policies and bills on first supply and in-service automated vehicle law.

=== New Zealand ===
New Zealand is a non-signatory country to the Vienna Convention. New Zealand legislation does not specifically require a driver to be present for a vehicle to be legally operated on a public road. However, most regulations and relevant international frameworks strongly imply the presence of a driver in the vehicle given that ‘automation’ was not a consideration at the time of drafting the legislation.

As of April 2022, Ministry of Transport is working on "Autonomous Vehicles Work Programme" with "Long-term Insights Briefing (LTIB)" which will include legislation issues.

== Legislation in Middle East ==
=== Israel ===
Israel is a signatory country to the Vienna Convention. As of April 2022, Israel Innovation Authority (OCS) is working on forming regulatory framework for trials and use of autonomous vehicles with Ministry of Transport and Road Safety (MOT) and Ministry of Justice.

In March 2022, the Knesset passed legislation that will allow companies to pilot autonomous shared transportation with passengers in the vehicle but without a safety driver on Israeli roads. The legislation allows companies and vehicle operators to obtain special licenses from MOT and to conduct trials with autonomous cars including for the purpose of transporting paying passengers and where an independent driving system replaces the driver.
