= Texas Department of Transportation =

Texas state government agency

Texas Department of Transportation (TxDOT)

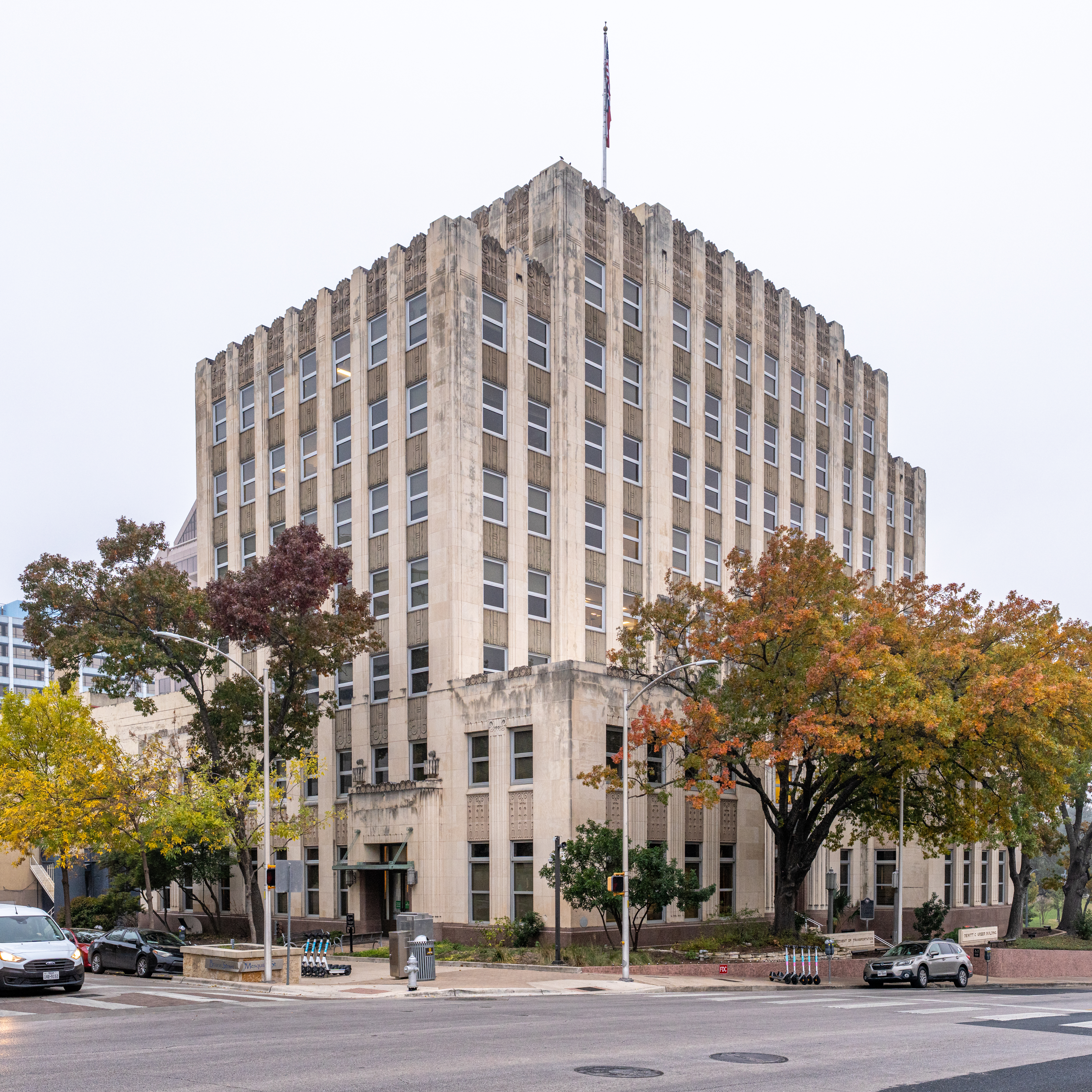
- Headquarters at the Dewitt C. Greer State Highway Building

Agency overview
- Formed: 1991
- Preceding agencies: Texas Highway Department; Texas Department of Highways and Public Transportation
- Jurisdiction: Texas
- Headquarters: Austin, Texas
- Agency executive: Marc D. Willams, Executive Director
- Website: txdot.gov

The Texas Department of Transportation (TxDOT /ˈtɛks.dɒt/) is a Texas state government agency responsible for construction and maintenance of the state's immense state highway system and the support of the state's maritime, aviation, rail, and public transportation systems. TxDOT previously administered vehicle registration prior to the creation of the Texas Department of Motor Vehicles in November 2009.

The agency has been headquartered in the Dewitt C. Greer Building in Austin since 1933.

== History ==
The Texas Legislature created the Texas Highway Department in 1916 to administer federal highway construction and maintenance. In 1975, its responsibilities increased when the agency merged with the Texas Mass Transportation Commission, resulting in the formation of the State Department of Highways and Public Transportation.

In 1986, the department started using "Don't Mess with Texas" as its slogan to reduce littering on Texas roadways, as part of a statewide advertising campaign. The phrase was prominently shown on road signs on major highways, as well as in television, radio, and print advertisements. The slogan is still in use and remains very popular.

In 1991, the Legislature combined the State Department of Highways and Public Transportation, the Department of Aviation, and the Texas Motor Vehicle Commission to create the Texas Department of Transportation (TxDOT).

In 1997, the pre-existing Texas Turnpike Authority (TTA) was divided into two successor agencies: the North Texas Tollway Authority took responsibility for TTA assets in four North Texas counties, while the Turnpike Authority Division of Texas DOT was given jurisdiction over toll facilities in the rest of the state.

In 2005, as a result of House Bill 2702 the rail oversight functions of the Texas Railroad Commission were transferred to TxDOT.

In 2009, the Texas Department of Motor Vehicles was created by the state legislature, taking over some functions from TxDOT.

In 2016, the Texas A&M University Press published MILES and MILES of TEXAS; 100 Years of the Texas Highway Department.

== Administration ==
TxDOT has approximately 12,000 employees. Marc Williams has served as its executive director since 2021. Williams had served as deputy executive director since 2015. He is assisted by two deputy directors, Brian Barth and Brandye Hendrickson. The department is organized into 25 geographical districts and 34 divisions.

=== Districts ===
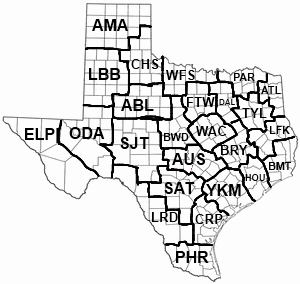
TxDOT districts map

TxDOT is one of the state's largest departments in terms of the number of subordinate offices – it maintains 25 geographical districts throughout the state. The large number of departments is needed due to the large size of the state, the widely varying climate and soil conditions affecting public roads, and the differing needs of the local populace (urban vs. suburban vs. rural).

In 2010, TxDOT was reorganized into four regions, North, South, East, and West. The regions are designated as Regional Support Centers. The number of districts remained the same. Each district, managed by a district engineer, is responsible for the design, location, construction, and maintenance of its area transportation systems. Local field offices within districts are known as area offices, and many districts also have separate maintenance offices, usually on a county-by-county basis. Functional divisions and offices headquartered in Austin provide administrative and technical support to the districts.

District	Counties
Abilene	Borden, Callahan, Fisher, Haskell, Howard, Jones, Kent, Mitchell, Nolan, Scurry, Shackelford, Taylor
Amarillo	Armstrong, Carson, Dallam, Deaf Smith, Gray, Hansford, Hartley, Hemphill, Hutchinson, Lipscomb, Moore, Ochiltree, Oldham, Potter, Randall, Roberts, Sherman
Atlanta	Bowie, Camp, Cass, Harrison, Marion, Morris, Panola, Titus, Upshur
Austin	Bastrop, Blanco, Burnet, Caldwell, Gillespie, Hays, Lee, Llano, Mason, Travis, Williamson
Beaumont	Chambers, Hardin, Jasper, Jefferson, Liberty, Newton, Orange, Tyler
Brownwood	Brown, Coleman, Comanche, Eastland, Lampasas, McCulloch, Mills, San Saba, Stephens
Bryan	Brazos, Burleson, Freestone, Grimes, Leon, Madison, Milam, Robertson, Walker, Washington
Childress	Briscoe, Childress, Collingsworth, Cottle, Dickens, Donley, Foard, Hall, Hardeman, King, Knox, Motley, Wheeler
Corpus Christi	Aransas, Bee, Goliad, Jim Wells, Karnes, Kleberg, Live Oak, Nueces, Refugio, San Patricio
Dallas	Collin, Dallas, Denton, Ellis, Kaufman, Navarro, Rockwall
El Paso	Brewster, Culberson, El Paso, Hudspeth, Jeff Davis, Presidio
Fort Worth	Erath, Hood, Jack, Johnson, Palo Pinto, Parker, Somervell, Tarrant, Wise
Houston	Brazoria, Fort Bend, Galveston, Harris, Montgomery, Waller
Laredo	Dimmit, Duval, Kinney, La Salle, Maverick, Val Verde, Webb, Zavala
Lubbock	Bailey, Castro, Cochran, Crosby, Dawson, Floyd, Gaines, Garza, Hale, Hockley, Lamb, Lubbock, Lynn, Parmer, Swisher, Terry, Yoakum
Lufkin	Angelina, Houston, Nacogdoches, Polk, Sabine, San Augustine, San Jacinto, Shelby, Trinity
Odessa	Andrews, Crane, Ector, Loving, Martin, Midland, Pecos, Reeves, Terrell, Upton, Ward, Winkler
Paris	Delta, Fannin, Franklin, Grayson, Hopkins, Hunt, Lamar, Rains, Red River
Pharr	Brooks, Cameron, Hidalgo, Jim Hogg, Kenedy, Starr, Willacy, Zapata
San Angelo	Coke, Concho, Crockett, Edwards, Glasscock, Irion, Kimble, Menard, Reagan, Real, Runnels, Schleicher, Sterling, Sutton, Tom Green
San Antonio	Atascosa, Bandera, Bexar, Comal, Frio, Guadalupe, Kendall, Kerr, McMullen, Medina, Uvalde, Wilson
Tyler	Anderson, Cherokee, Gregg, Henderson, Rusk, Smith, Van Zandt, Wood
Waco	Bell, Bosque, Coryell, Falls, Hamilton, Hill, Limestone, McLennan
Wichita Falls	Archer, Baylor, Clay, Cooke, Montague, Throckmorton, Wichita, Wilbarger, Young
Yoakum	Austin, Calhoun, Colorado, DeWitt, Fayette, Gonzales, Lavaca, Matagorda, Stonewall, Victoria, Wharton

=== Divisions ===
- Aviation
- Bridge
- Civil Rights
- Communications
- Compliance
- Construction
- Contracts and Purchasing
- Design
- Environmental Affairs
- Financial Management
- Fleet Operations
- General Counsel
- General Services
- Government Affairs
- Human Resources
- Information Technology
- Internal Audit
- Maintenance
- Maritime
- Materials and Tests
- Occupational Safety
- Professional Engineering Procurement Services
- Project Finance and Debt Management
- Public Transportation
- Rail
- Real Estate Management and Development
- Research and Technology Implementation
- Right of Way
- Strategic Contract Management
- Strategic Planning
- Support Services
- Toll Operations
- Traffic Operations
- Transportation Planning and Programming
- Travel Information

== Publications ==
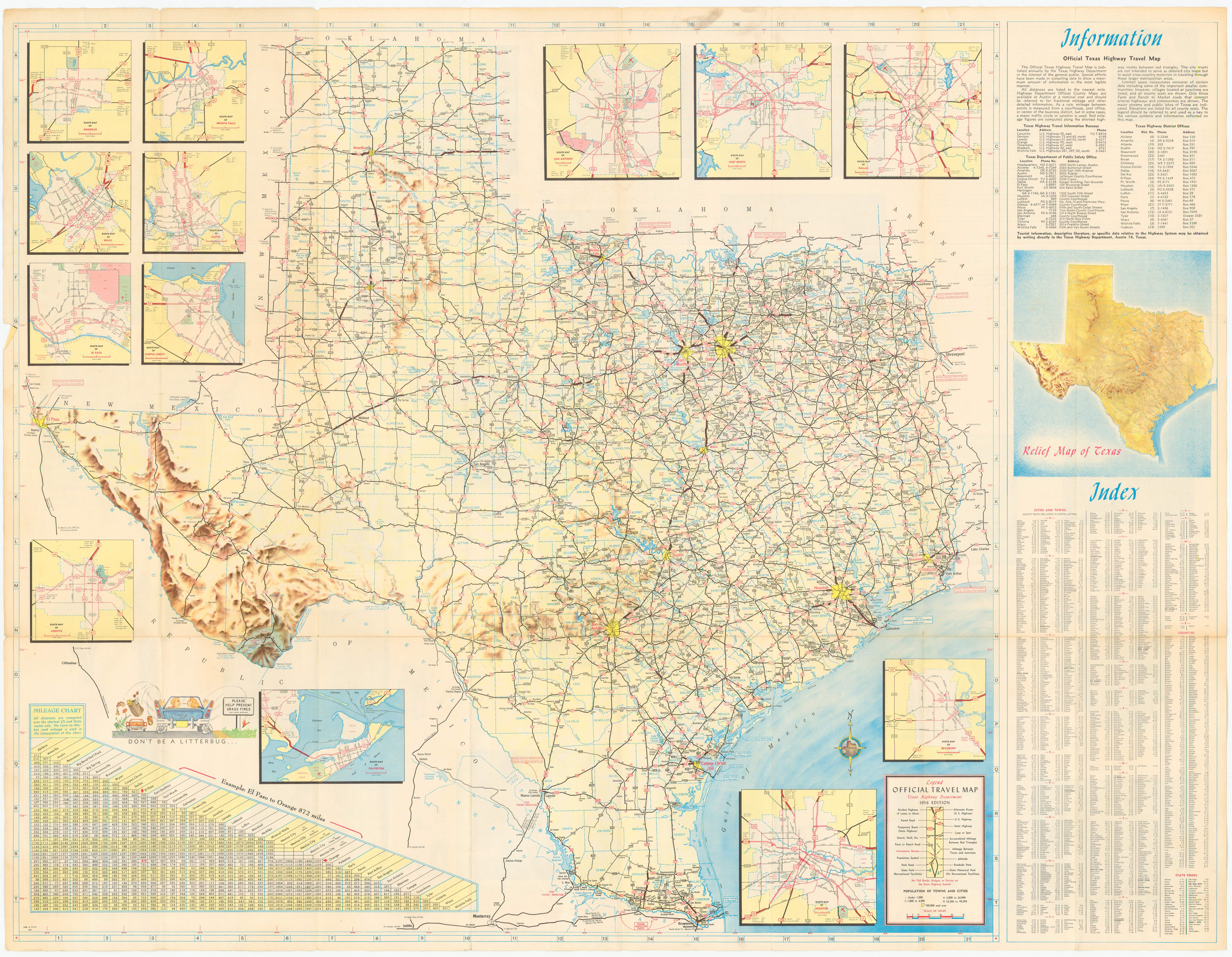
The 1956 edition of the Texas Official Travel Map: The Transportation Department has been publishing an official state road map since 1917.

Every month, TxDOT publishes Texas Highways, a magazine aimed at showcasing various aspects of the state, often by providing interesting travel information on a specific stretch of highway (or highways) in the state. TxDOT also publishes the annual Texas Travel Guide, which offers points of interests for all regions of Texas.

Horizon is a quarterly journal focusing on transportation policy issues and financing in particular.

== Gallery ==
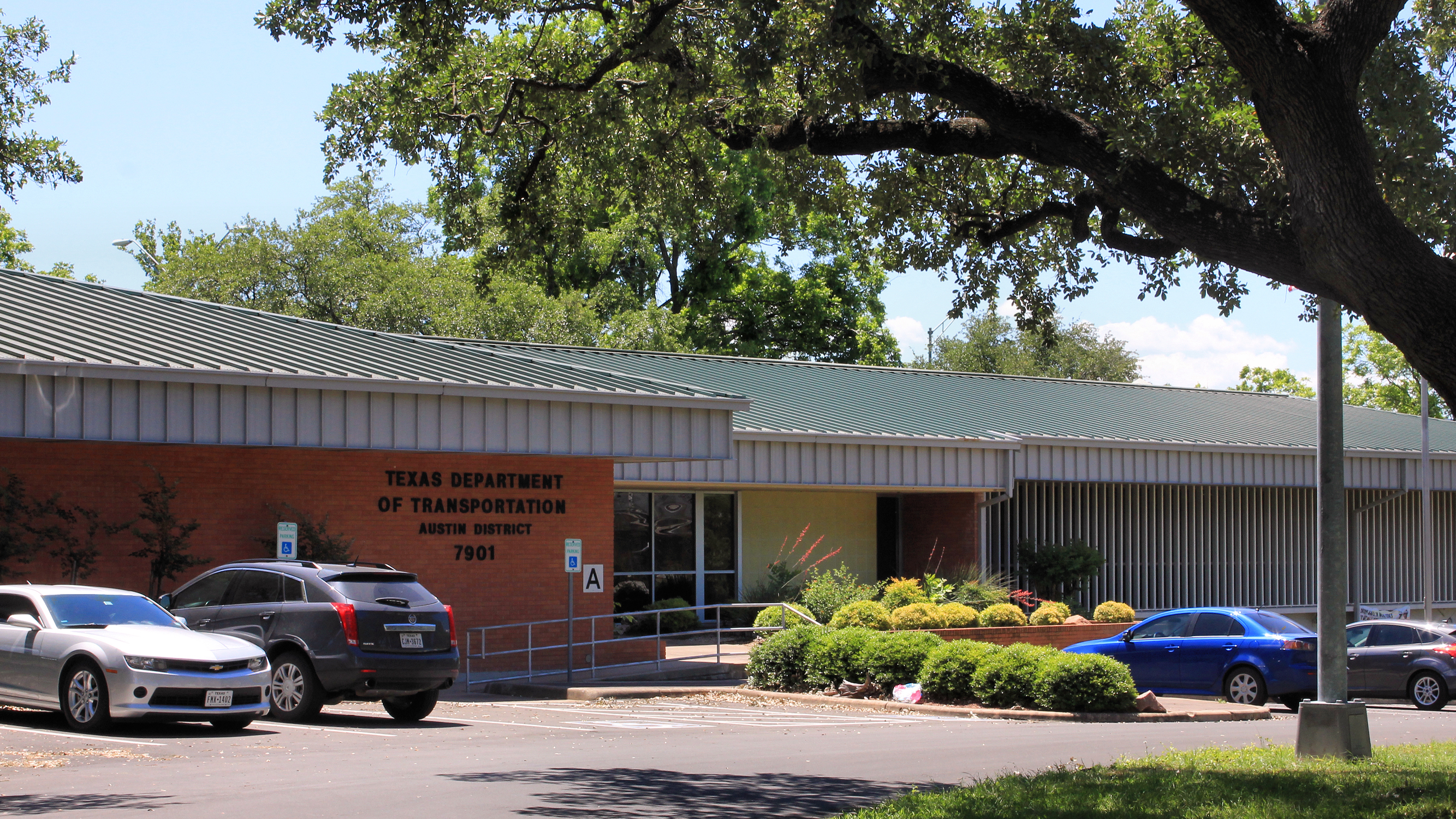
TxDOT Austin District office

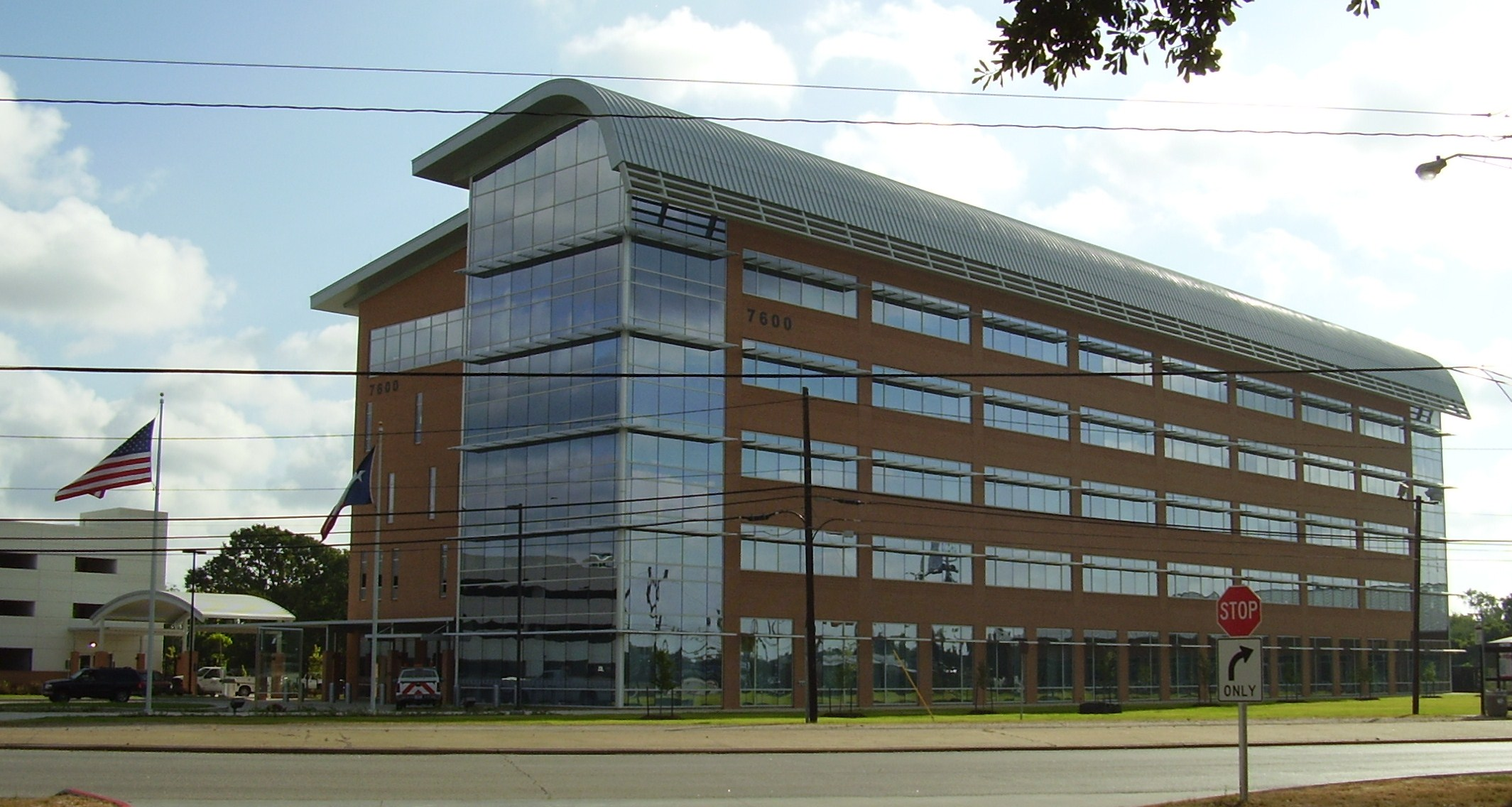
One building of the headquarters of TxDOT's Houston district

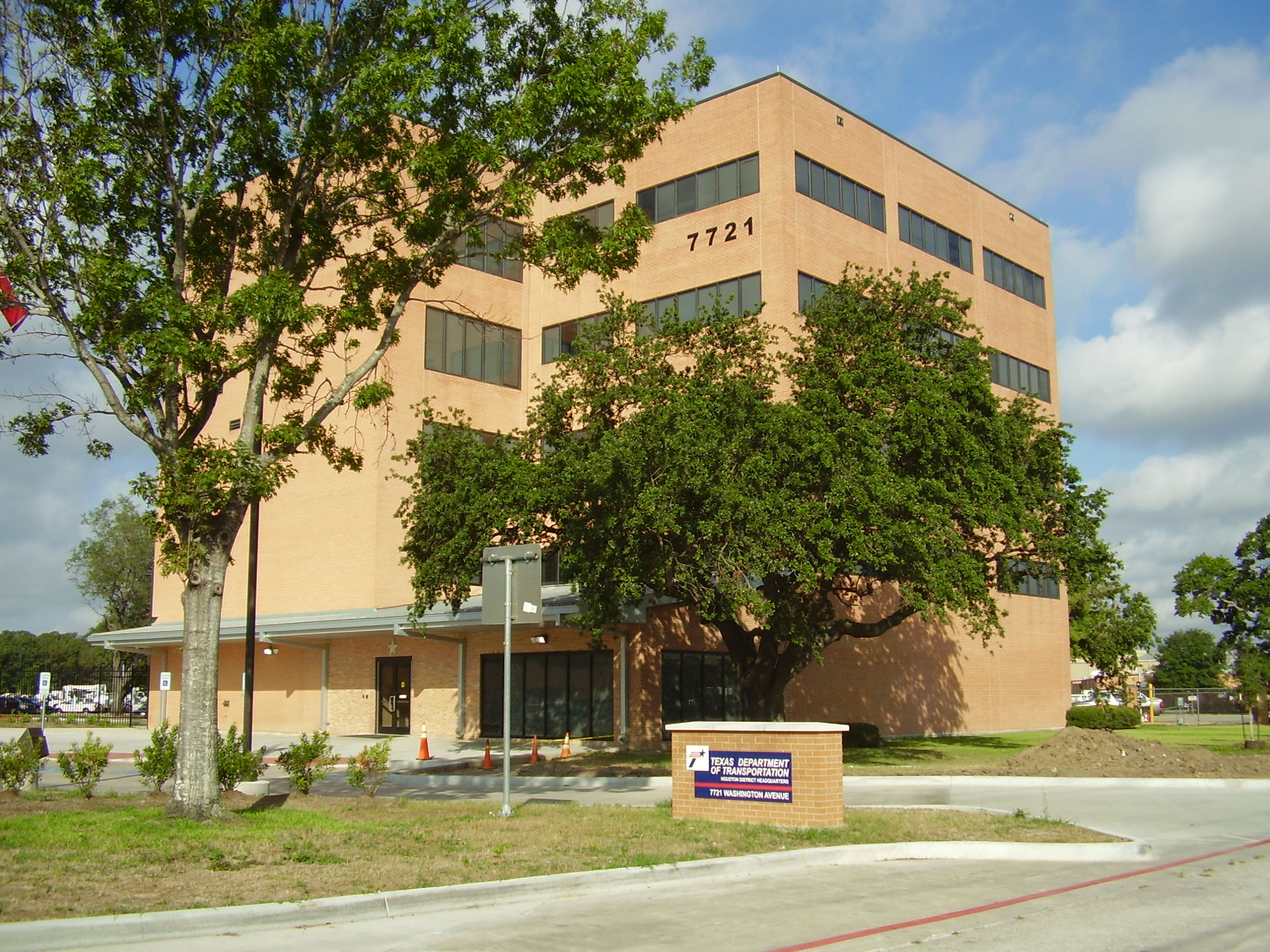
One building of the headquarters of TxDOT's Houston district
