= Texas Department of Motor Vehicles =

State agency of Texas, United States

- Abbreviation: TxDMV

Agency overview
- Formed: 2009

Jurisdictional structure
- Operations jurisdiction: United States

Operational structure
- Headquarters: 4000 Jackson Avenue; Austin, Texas
- Agency executives: Daniel Avitia, Executive Director; Shelly Mellott, Deputy Executive Director

Website
- www.txdmv.gov

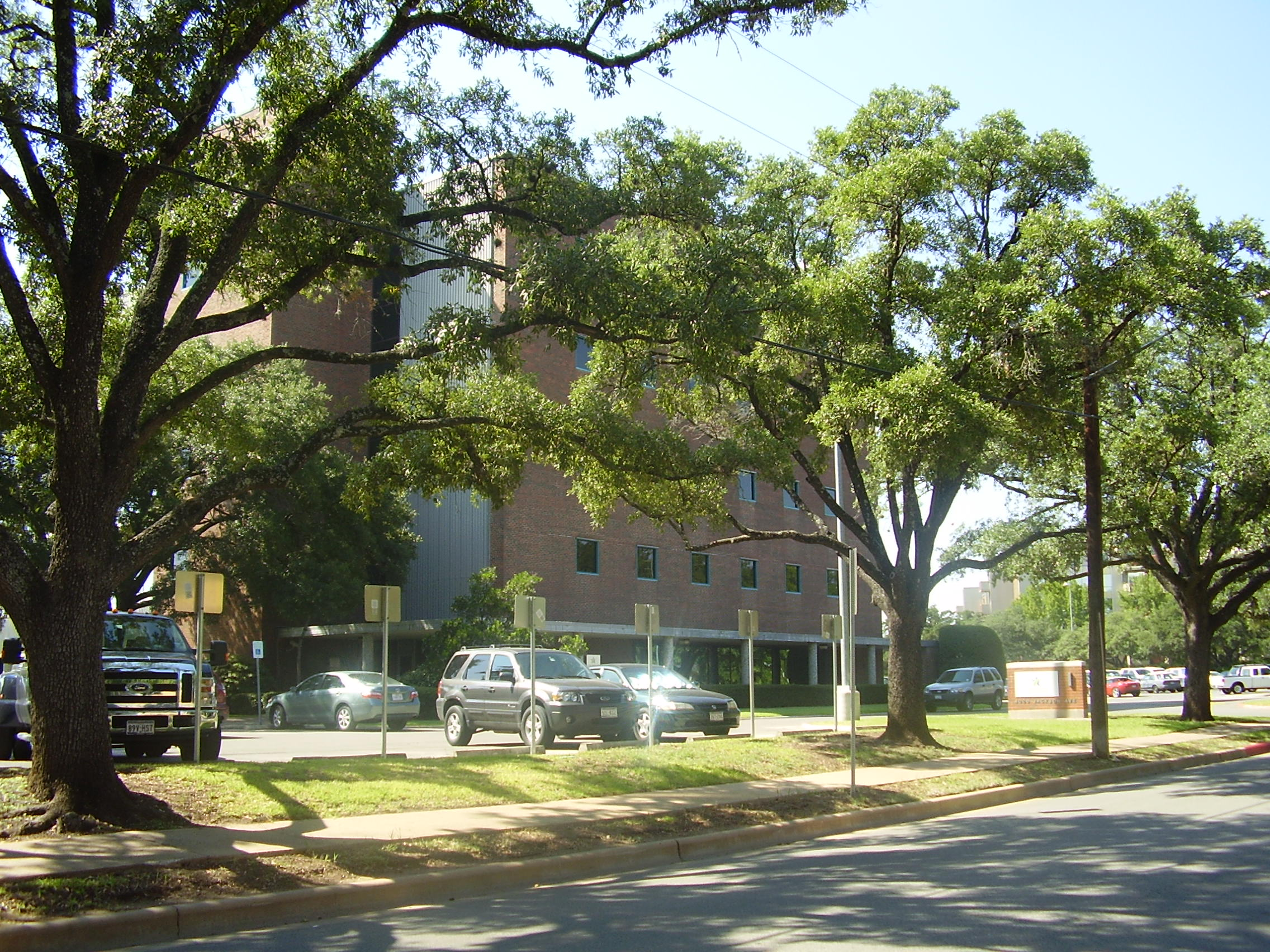
Texas Department of Motor Vehicles Building 1, the headquarters

The Texas Department of Motor Vehicles (TxDMV) is a state agency of Texas, headquartered in Austin. The agency handles vehicle registration and titling, authorizes operating authorities of motor carriers, and gives grants to law enforcement agencies to increase public awareness about automobile theft and to reduce automobile theft.

During the 81st session of the Texas Legislature, Governor of Texas Rick Perry signed House Bill 3097 into law in June 2009, authorizing the creation of the agency. The agency began operations in November of that year, taking some functions previously held by the Texas Department of Transportation.
