= Operational design domain =

Operating context for an autonomous vehicle

Operational design domain (ODD) is a term for a particular operating context for an automated system, often used in the field of autonomous vehicles. The context is defined by a set of conditions, including environmental, geographical, time of day, and other conditions. For vehicles, traffic and roadway characteristics are included. Manufacturers use ODD to indicate where/how their product operates safely. A given system may operate differently according to the immediate ODD.

The concept presumes that automated systems have limitations. Relating system function to the ODD it supports is important for developers and regulators to establish and communicate safe operating conditions. Systems should operate within those limitations. Some systems recognize the ODD and modify their behavior accordingly. For example, an autonomous car might recognize that traffic is heavy and disable its automated lane change feature.

ODD is used for cars, for ships, trains, agricultural robots, and other robots.

== Definitions ==
Various regulators have offered definitions of related terms:

Definition	Source
"operating conditions under which a given driving automation system ... or feature thereof is specifically designed to function"	ISO/TS 14812:2022(en), 3.7.3.2
"operating conditions under which a given automated driving system ... or feature thereof is specifically designed to function, including, but not limited to, environmental, geographical, and time-of-day restrictions, and/or the requisite presence or absence of certain traffic or roadway characteristics"	ISO/TR 4804:2020(en), 3.37
"operating conditions under which a given driving automation system or feature thereof is specifically designed to function, including, but not limited to, environmental, geographical, and time-of-day restrictions, and/or the requisite presence or absence of certain traffic or roadway characteristics"	ISO 34501:2022(en), 3.26
"specific conditions under which a given driving automation system is designed to function"	ISO 21448:2022(en), 3.21
"operating conditions under which a given driving automation system or feature thereof is specifically designed to function"	BSI PAS 1883
"set of environments and situations the item is to operate within"	ANSI/UL 4600
"environmental, geographic, time-of-day, traffic, infrastructure, weather and other conditions under which an automated driving system is specifically designed to function"	Global Forum for Road Traffic Safety (WP.1) resolution on the deployment of highly and fully automated vehicles in road traffic
"For the assessment of the vehicle safety, the vehicle manufacturers should document the [ODD] available on their vehicles and the functionality of the vehicle within the prescribed [ODD]. The [ODD] should describe the specific conditions under which the automated vehicle is intended to drive in the automated mode. The [ODD] should include the following information at a minimum: roadway types; geographic area; speed range; environmental conditions (weather as well as day/night time); and other domain constraints."	Revised Framework document on automated/autonomous vehicles (WP.29)
An "automated lane keeping system defines the specific operating conditions (e.g., environmental, geographic, time-of-day, traffic, infrastructure, speed range, weather, and other conditions) within the boundaries fixed by this regulation under which the automated lane keeping system is designed to operate without any intervention by the driver."	UN Regulation No 157 – Uniform provisions concerning the approval of vehicles with regards to Automated Lane Keeping Systems [2021/389]
An ODD is defined in terms of physical infrastructure, operational constraints, objects, connectivity, environmental conditions, and zones. Physical infrastructure includes roadway types, surfaces, edges, and geometry. Operational constraints include speed limits and traffic conditions. Environmental conditions include weather, illumination, etc. Zones include regions, states, school areas, and construction sites.	US Department of Transportation report
'Operational design Domain ('ODD')' means operating conditions under which a given ADS is specifically designed to function, including, but not limited to, environmental, geographical, and time-of-day restrictions and/or the requisite presence or absence of specific traffic or roadway characteristics.	EU Commission Implementing Regulation (EU) 2022/1426

== Examples ==
In 2022, Mercedes-Benz announced a product with an ODD of Level 3 autonomous driving at 130 km/h.

== See also ==
- Scenario (vehicular automation)
