= Scenario (vehicular automation) =

In the field of vehicular automation a scenario denotes a sequence of snapshots of the environment and the actions of a vehicle. Scenarios are created to represent real-world situations and are used for development, testing, and validation purposes.

== Standards ==
Definition	Source
"description of the temporal relationship between several scenes ... in a sequence of scenes, with goals and values within a specified situation, influenced by actions ... and events"	ISO 21448:2022(en), 3.26
"sequence of scenes ... usually including the automated driving system(s) .../subject vehicle(s) ..., and its/their interactions in the process of performing the dynamic driving task"	ISO 34501:2022(en), 3.4

== Operational design domain ==
According to ASAM's OpenODD concept paper, scenarios are related to operational design domain. However, they are not the same. Defining the appropriate behavior of actors within an ODD creates a scenario that is not dependent on any ODD definition.

== History ==
In 2022, Netherlands Organisation for Applied Scientific Research announced scenario-based safety validation of self-driving trucks in cooperation with Torc Robotics.

== See also ==
- Verification and validation
