= Waymo =

Autonomous car technology company

Waymo LLC
- Type: Subsidiary
- Industry: Autonomous cars
- Predecessor: Google Self-Driving Car Project
- Founded: 2004; 22 years ago (as Stanford Self-Driving Car Team); January 17, 2009; 17 years ago (as the Google Self-Driving Car Project); December 13, 2016; 9 years ago (as Waymo)
- Founder: Sebastian Thrun; Anthony Levandowski
- Headquarters: Mountain View, California, United States
- Area served: United States; More information: § Services
- Key people: Dmitri Dolgov (co-CEO); Tekedra Mawakana (co-CEO)
- Owner: Google, Inc. (2009–2016); Alphabet Inc. (2016–present)
- Number of employees: 2,500 (2025)
- Website: waymo.com

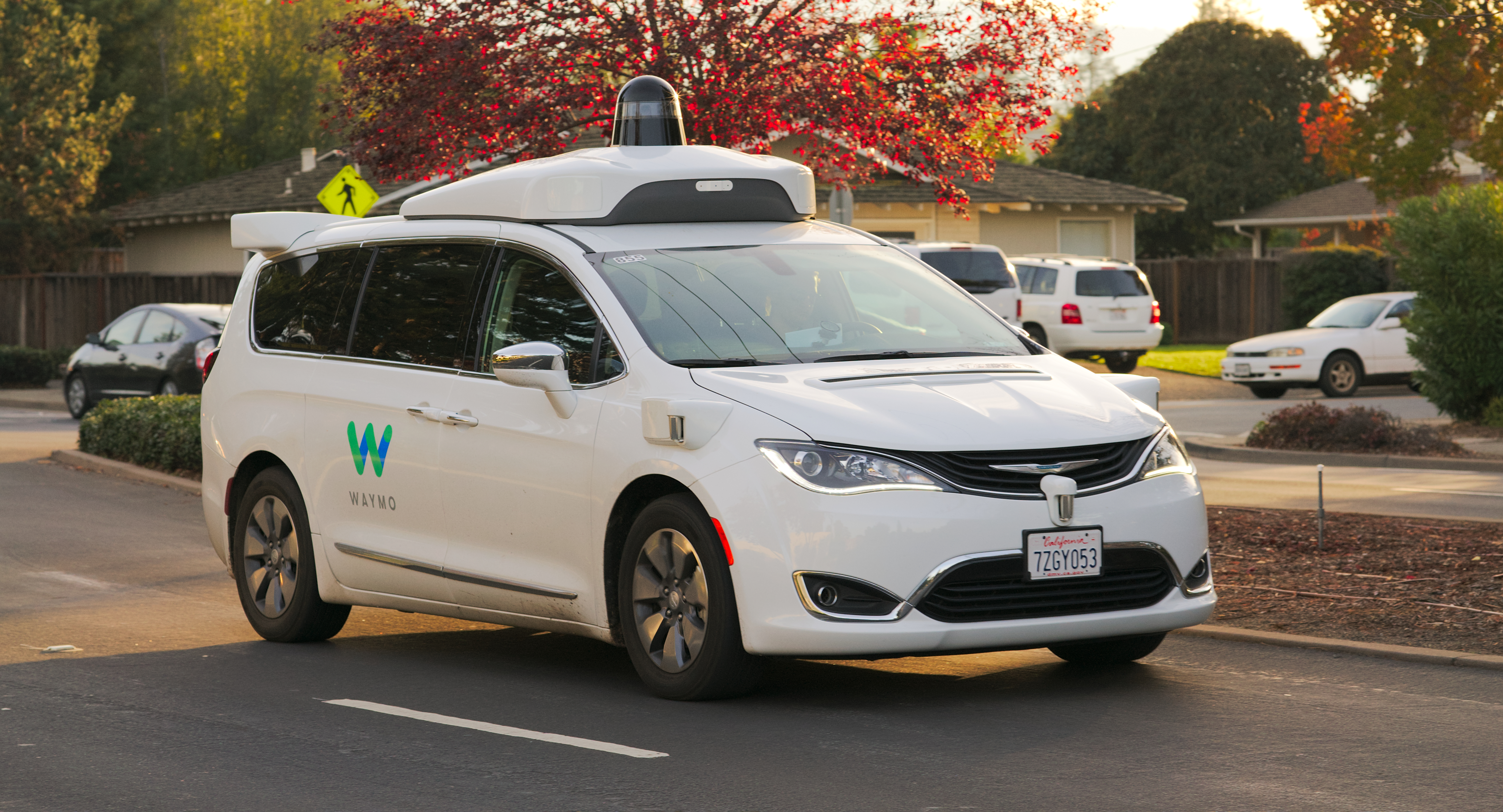
Waymo Chrysler Pacifica Hybrid undergoing testing in the San Francisco Bay Area (2017)

Waymo LLC (/weɪmoʊ/ WAY-moh) is an American autonomous driving technology company headquartered in Mountain View, California. It is a subsidiary of Alphabet Inc., Google's parent company. As of June 2026, Waymo operates public commercial robotaxi services in 10 US metropolitan areas, has 3,871 robotaxis in service, provides 500,000 paid rides per week, and has logged 200 million fully autonomous miles.

The company traces its origins to the Stanford University Racing Team, which competed in the 2005 and 2007 Defense Advanced Research Projects Agency (DARPA) Grand Challenges. Google's development of self-driving technology began in January 2009, and the project was revealed in October 2010. In December 2016, the project was renamed Waymo and spun out of Google as part of Alphabet. In October 2020, Waymo became the first company to offer service to the public without safety drivers.

Co-CEOs Tekedra Mawakana and Dmitri Dolgov have run Waymo since April 2021. The company raised $11 billion in multiple outside funding rounds by 2024. In February 2026, Waymo raised $16 billion, which valued the company at $126 billion.

In January 2026, the National Transportation Safety Board (NTSB) and National Highway Traffic Safety Administration (NHTSA) opened investigations into Waymo's robotaxis for recurring incidents of illegally passing stopped school buses, and one incident where a robotaxi hit a child who ran out from behind a parked SUV in a school zone.

== History ==
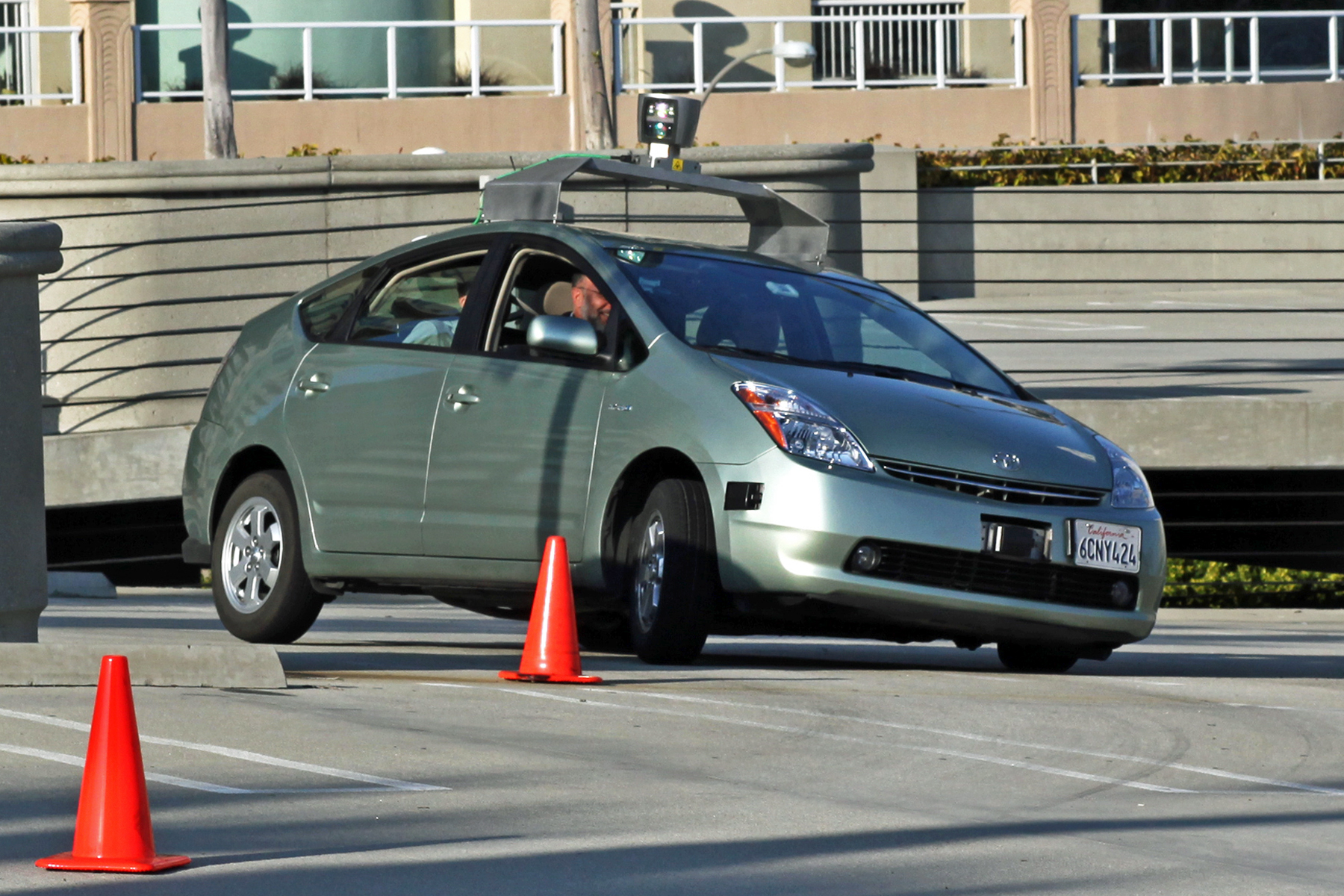
A Toyota Prius modified to operate as a Google driverless car, navigating a test course (2011)

=== Ground work ===
Google's development of self-driving technology began on January 17, 2009, at Google X lab, run by Google co-founder Sergey Brin. The project was launched at Google by Sebastian Thrun, the former director of the Stanford Artificial Intelligence Laboratory (SAIL) and Anthony Levandowski, founder of 510 Systems and Anthony's Robots.

The initial software code and artificial intelligence (AI) design of the effort started before the team worked at Google, when Thrun and 15 engineers, including Dmitri Dolgov, Mike Montemerlo, Hendrik Dahlkamp, Sven Strohband, and David Stavens, built Stanley and Junior, Stanford's entries in the 2005 and 2007 DARPA Challenges. Later, aspects of this technology were used in a digital mapping project for SAIL called VuTool. In 2007, Google acqui-hired the entire VuTool team to help advance Google's Street View technology.

As part of Street View development, 100 Toyota Priuses were outfitted with Topcon digital mapping hardware developed by 510 Systems.

In 2008, the Street View team launched project Ground Truth, to create accurate road maps by extracting data from satellites and street views.

=== Pribot ===
In February 2008, a Discovery Channel producer for the documentary series Prototype This! phoned Levandowski. The producer requested to borrow Levandowski's Ghost Rider, the autonomous two-wheeled motorcycle Levandowski's Berkeley team had built for the 2004 DARPA Grand Challenge that Levandowski had later donated to the Smithsonian. Since the motorcycle was not available, Levandowski offered to retrofit a Toyota Prius as a self-driving pizza delivery car for the show.

As a Google employee, Levandowski asked Larry Page and Thrun whether Google wanted to participate in the show. Both declined, citing liability issues. However, they authorized Levandowski to move forward with the project, as long as it was not associated with Google. Within weeks Levandowski founded Anthony's Robots to do so. He retrofitted the car with light detection and ranging (lidar) technology, sensors, and cameras. The Stanford team behind the Stanley car provided the project with its codebase. The ensuing episode depicting Pribot delivering pizza across the San Francisco Bay Bridge under police escort aired in December 2008.

The project's success convinced Google to greenlight its own self-driving car program in January 2009. In 2011, Google acquired 510 Systems (co-founded by Levandowski, Pierre-Yves Droz and Andrew Schultz), and Anthony's Robots for an estimated US$20 million. Levandowski's vehicle and hardware, and Stanford's AI technology and software, became the nucleus of the project.

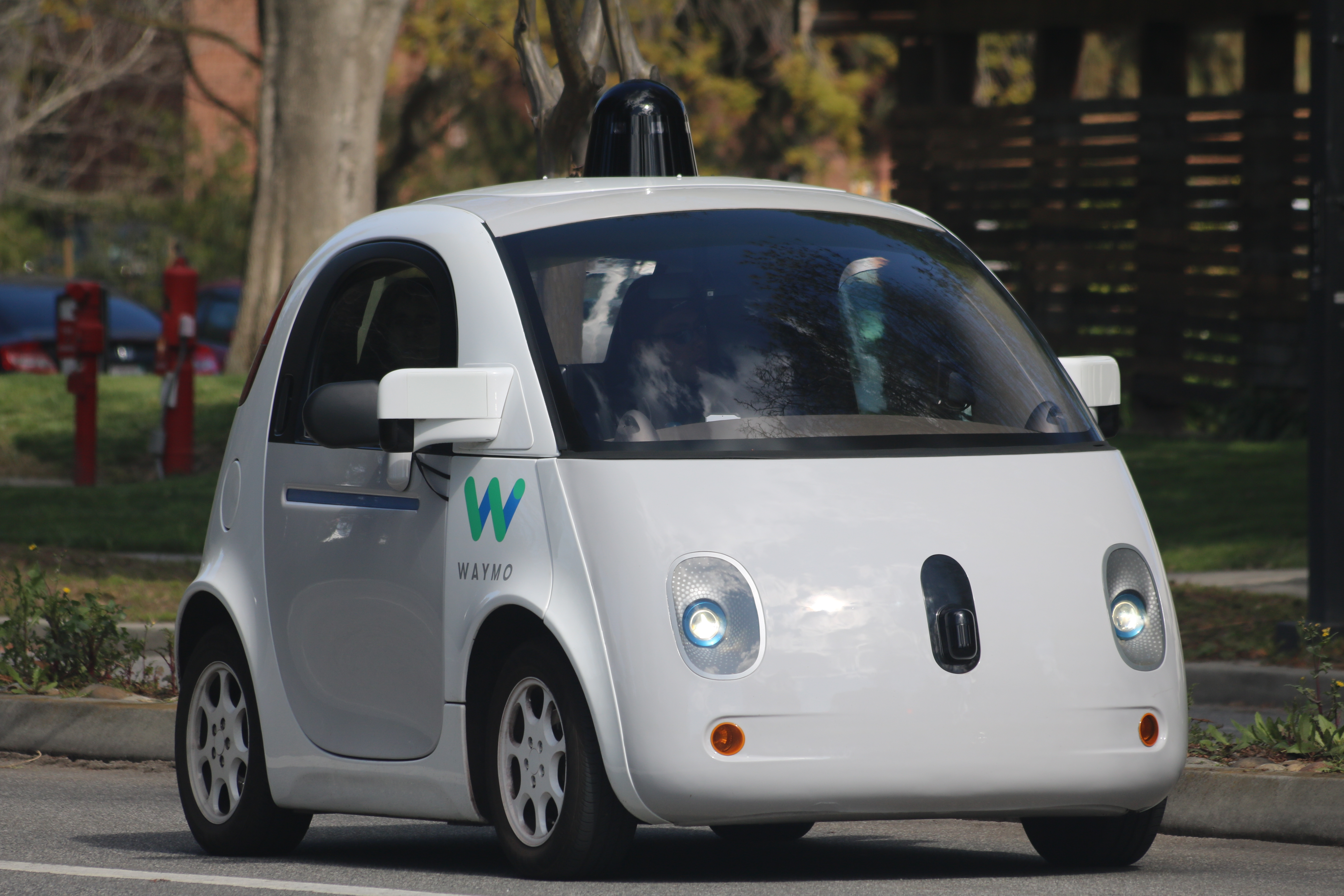
A Firefly self-driving Waymo car (2017)

=== Project Chauffeur ===
After almost two years of road testing with seven vehicles, the New York Times revealed Google's project on October 9, 2010. Google announced its initiative later the same day.

Starting in 2010, lawmakers in various states expressed concerns over how to regulate autonomous vehicles. A related Nevada law went into effect on March 1, 2012. Google had been lobbying for such laws. A modified Prius was licensed by the Nevada Department of Motor Vehicles (DMV) in May 2012. The car was "driven" by Chris Urmson with Levandowski in the passenger seat. This was the first US license for a self-driven car.

In January 2014 Google was granted a patent for a transportation service funded by advertising that included autonomous vehicles as a transport method. In late May, Google revealed an autonomous prototype, which had no steering wheel, gas pedal, or brake pedal. In December, Google unveiled a Firefly prototype that was planned to be tested on San Francisco Bay Area roads beginning in early 2015.

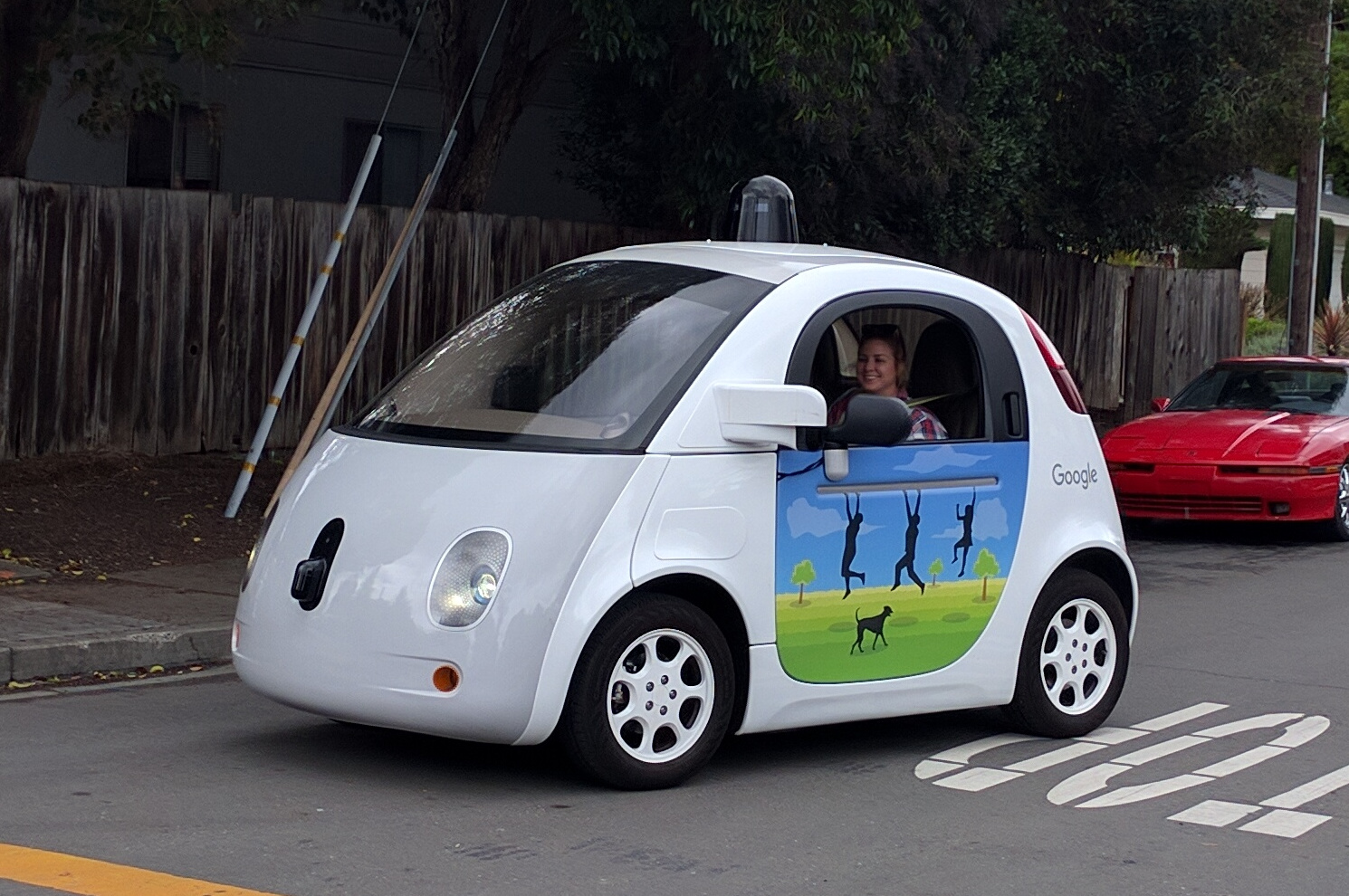
A self-driving car with the previous Google branding (2016)

In 2015, Levandowski left the project. In August 2015, Google hired former Hyundai Motor executive, John Krafcik, as CEO. In fall 2015, the first ride in a fully autonomous vehicle by a non-Google employee was undertaken by a blind man in Austin, Texas. It was the first entirely autonomous trip on a public road and was not accompanied by a test driver or police escort. The car had no steering wheel or floor pedals. By the end of 2015, Project Chauffeur vehicles had driven more than one million miles.

Google spent $1.1 billion on the project between 2009 and 2015. For comparison, the acquisition of Cruise Automation by General Motors in March 2016 was for $500 million, and Uber's acquisition of Otto in August 2016 was for $680 million.

=== Waymo ===
In May 2016, Google and Stellantis announced an order of 100 Chrysler Pacifica hybrid minivans to test the self-driving technology. In December 2016, the project changed its name to Waymo and spun out of Google as part of Alphabet. The name was derived from "a new way forward in mobility". In May 2016, the company opened a 53,000-square-foot (4,900 m^{2}) technology center in Novi, Michigan.

In February 2017, Waymo sued Uber and its subsidiary self-driving trucking company, Otto, alleging trade secret theft and patent infringement. The company claimed that three ex-Google employees, including Anthony Levandowski, had stolen trade secrets, including thousands of files, from Google before joining Uber. The alleged infringement was related to Waymo's proprietary lidar technology, Google accused Uber of colluding with Levandowski. Levandowski allegedly downloaded 9 gigabytes of data that included over a hundred trade secrets; eight of which were at stake during the trial. An ensuing settlement gave Waymo 0.34% of Uber stock, the equivalent of $245 million. Uber agreed not to infringe Waymo's intellectual property. Part of the agreement included a guarantee that "Waymo confidential information is not being incorporated in Uber Advanced Technologies Group hardware and software." In statements released after the settlement, Uber maintained that it received no trade secrets. In May, according to an Uber spokesman, Uber had fired Levandowski, which resulted in the loss of roughly $250 million of his equity in Uber, which almost exactly equaled the settlement. Uber announced that it was halting production of self-driving trucks through Otto in July 2018, and the subsidiary company was shuttered. In 2020, Levandowski pled guilty to one of 33 charges, and was sentenced to 18 months in prison.

Waymo began testing minivans without a safety driver on public roads in Chandler, Arizona, in October 2017. In 2017, Waymo unveiled new sensors and chips that are less expensive to manufacture, cameras that improve visibility, and wipers to clear the lidar system. At the beginning of the self-driving car program, they used a $75,000 lidar system from Velodyne. In 2017, the cost decreased approximately 90 percent, as Waymo converted to in-house built lidar. Waymo has applied its technology to various cars including the Prius, Audi TT, Chrysler Pacifica, and Lexus RX450h. Waymo partners with Lyft on pilot projects and product development.

Waymo started testing in Phoenix without safety drivers in November 2017.

Waymo-operated Jaguar I-Pace in San Francisco (2023)

In March 2018, Jaguar Land Rover announced that Waymo had ordered up to 20,000 of its I-Pace electric SUVs at an estimated cost of more than $1 billion. In late May 2018, Alphabet announced plans to add up to 62,000 Pacifica Hybrid minivans to the fleet. Also in May 2018, Waymo established Huimo Business Consulting subsidiary in Shanghai.

In October 2018, the California Department of Motor Vehicles issued a permit for Waymo to operate cars without safety drivers. Waymo was the first company to receive a permit for day and night testing on public roads and highways. Waymo announced that its service would include Mountain View, Sunnyvale, Los Altos, and Palo Alto. In July 2019, Waymo received permission to transport passengers.

In December 2018, Waymo launched Waymo One in Phoenix, transporting passengers. The service used safety drivers to monitor some rides, with others provided in select areas without them. In November 2019, Waymo One became the first autonomous service worldwide to operate without safety drivers. Waymo One launched in San Francisco, beginning with a "trusted tester" rollout. In March 2022, Waymo began offering rides for Waymo staff in San Francisco without a safety driver.

In April 2019, Waymo announced plans for vehicle assembly in Detroit at the former American Axle & Manufacturing plant, bringing between 100 and 400 jobs to the area. Waymo used vehicle assembler Magna to turn Jaguar I-PACE electric SUVs and Chrysler Pacifica Hybrid minivans into Waymo Level 4 autonomous vehicles. Waymo subsequently reverted to retrofitting existing models rather than a custom design.

=== 2020s ===
In March 2020, Waymo Via launched after the company announced it had raised $2.25 billion from investors. In May 2020, Waymo raised an additional $750 million. In July 2020, the company announced an exclusive partnership with auto manufacturer Volvo to integrate Waymo technology.

In April 2021, Krafcik was replaced by two co-CEOs: Waymo's COO Tekedra Mawakana and CTO Dmitri Dolgov. Mawakana is responsible for business operations, and Dolgov is responsible for the company's technology. Waymo raised $2.5 billion in another funding round in June 2021, with total funding of $5.5 billion. Waymo launched a consumer testing program in San Francisco in August 2021.

In May 2022, Waymo started a pilot program seeking riders in downtown Phoenix, Arizona. In May 2022, Waymo announced that it would expand the program to more areas of Phoenix. In 2023, coverage of the Waymo One area was increased by 45 square miles (120 km^{2}), expanding to include downtown Mesa, uptown Phoenix, and South Mountain Village.

In June 2022, Waymo announced a partnership with Uber, under which Waymo will integrate its autonomous technology into Uber's freight truck service. Plans to expand the program to Los Angeles were announced in late 2022. On December 13, 2022, Waymo applied for the final permit necessary to operate fully autonomous taxis, without a backup driver present, within the state of California.

In January 2023, The Information reported that Waymo staff were among those affected by Google's layoffs of around 12,000 workers. TechCrunch reported that Waymo was set to kill its trucking program.

In July 2024, Waymo began testing its sixth-generation robotaxis, based on electric vehicles from Chinese automaker Zeekr, developed through a partnership first announced in 2021. They were anticipated to reduce costs, at a time when Waymo was operating at a loss.

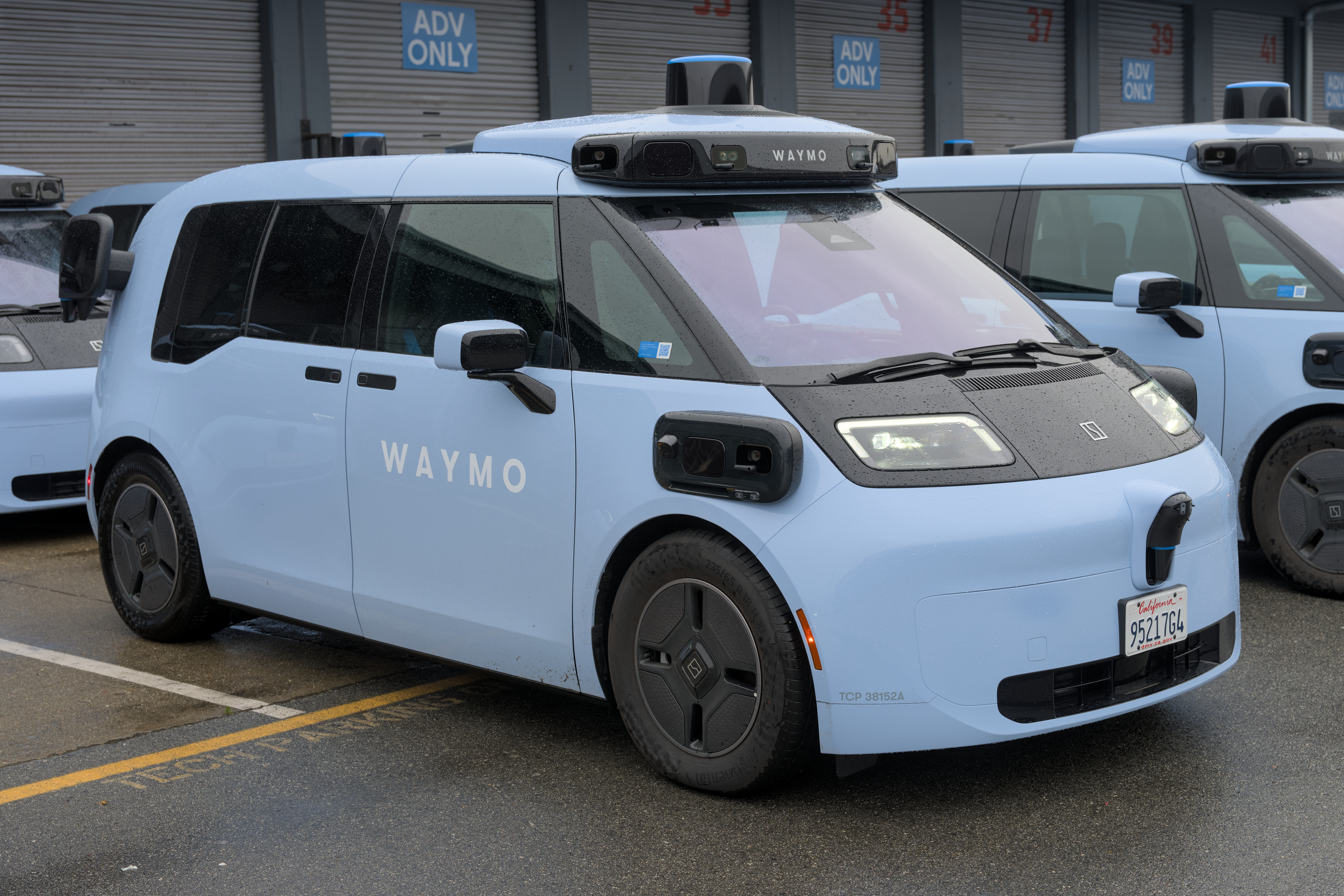
Sixth generation Zeekr vehicles in December 2025.

In October 2024, Waymo closed a $5.6 billion funding round led by Alphabet to expand its robotaxi services, bringing its total capital to over $11 billion. Around that time, The New York Times described Waymo as being "far ahead of the competition", in particular after Cruise had to suspend its operations after an accident in 2023.

In November 2025, Waymo introduced freeway travel for select riders. Waymo paused all freeway service from May to July 2026.

In November 2025, the permit area in Northern California expanded to include Santa Rosa and Sacramento. The Southern California permit area was expanded to stretch from the Mexican border to Ventura County. These new permit areas were approved by the California Department of Motor Vehicles (DMV). The permit area of the DMV is larger than the operating area. The operating area is slated to get expanded to cover San Diego in mid-2026.

In February 2026, Waymo raised a $16 billion funding round, valuing the company at $126 billion to fund further expansion into new markets. Bloomberg reported that $13 billion of that came from Alphabet.

In October 2026, Waymo expanded their service area in San Diego to include La Jolla. This was an attempt to fix multiple issues. Firstly, it allows for more financial possibilities for the company and consumer use. The company also claims that this expansion was based on data regarding drunk driving and Waymo’s safety. Waymo claims that based on data taking drunk drivers off the roads can reduce deadly car crashes by 22%. Their data also shows that the Waymo driver was involved in 95% less crashes that cause serious injuries or fatalities than human drivers.

==== Lobbying ====
Waymo regularly lobbies public officials and regulators across U.S. cities and states to update laws so self-driving vehicles can operate there. In 2024, Waymo spent $1.7 million on lobbying in the US. In the state of New York, Waymo has spent $1.8 million since 2019 on lobbying efforts, as of January 2026. Waymo spent $2 million in lobbying in the US in the first six months of 2026.

In February 2026, Waymo representatives spoke to the United States Senate Committee on Commerce, Science, and Transportation and asked the federal government to create uniform nationwide standards for autonomous vehicle deployment. The company stated that unless the US reduces regulations that hamper innovation, US companies will lose the trillion-dollar global autonomous vehicle market to Chinese companies.

== Services ==
In 2017, Waymo highlighted four business uses for its autonomous technology: robotaxis; trucking and logistics; urban public transportation; and passenger cars. As of 2023, trucking is no longer a focus.

=== Robotaxis ===
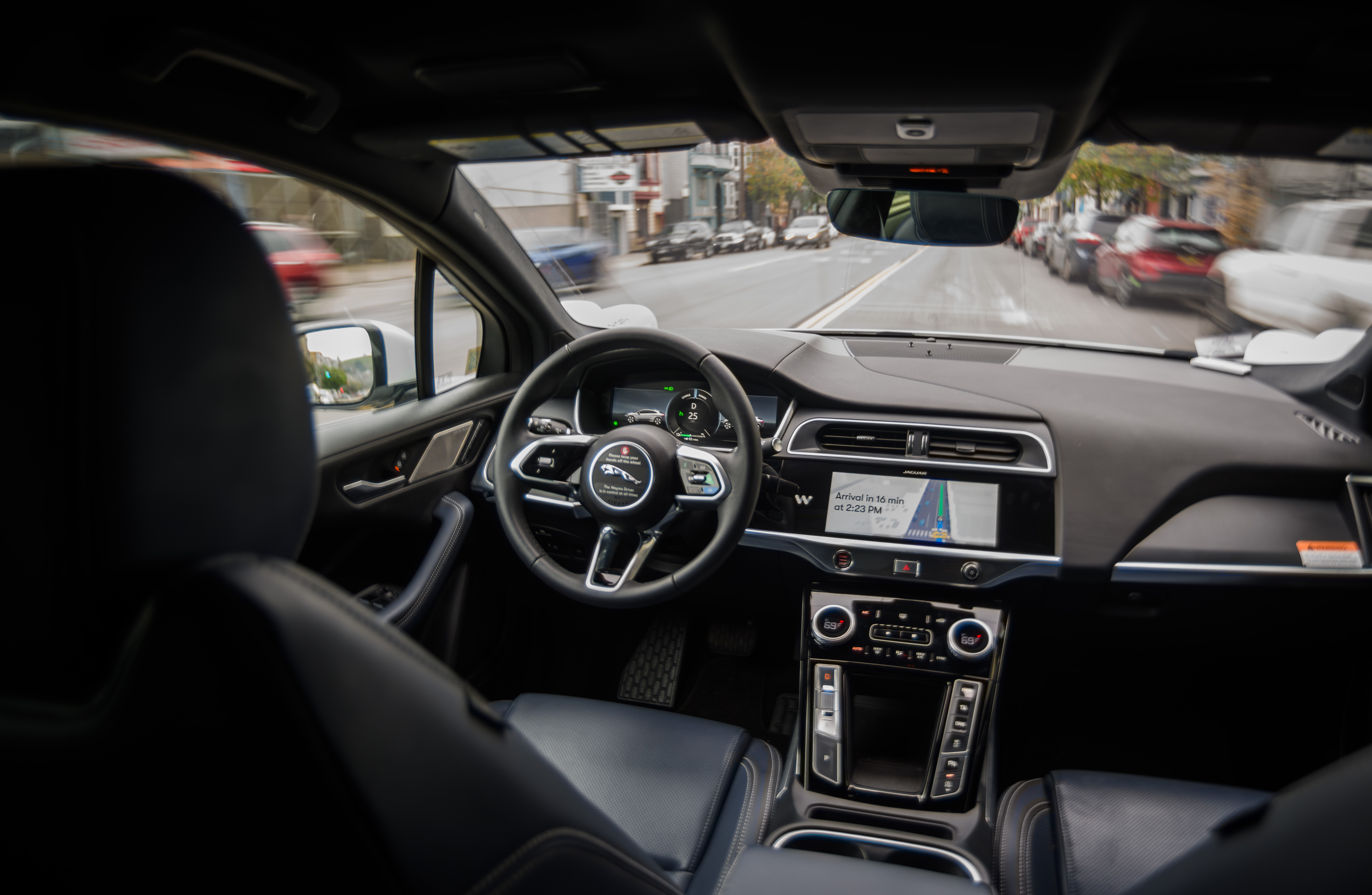
The interior of a Waymo Jaguar I-Pace robotaxi as it autonomously drives through San Francisco

As of October 2026, Waymo serves select metropolitan areas in the United States, covering about 1,890 square miles (4,900 km^{2}) with about 11.3 million residents, up from 218 square miles (560 km^{2}) and 1.65 million residents in February 2024. Waymo has announced expansion into several other countries.

The service is accessed in most locations by using the Waymo iOS app or Android app. Waymo service in Austin and Atlanta is available by using the Uber app, although this is scheduled to end in January 2028. Service in Nashville is available on both the Waymo app and the Lyft app. Once a Waymo vehicle arrives, riders push a button to "start ride", and have optional "help", "lock", and "pull over" buttons. Rides usually complete without riders pressing any optional buttons. The car's steering wheel turns as the car makes turns, and a passenger may sit in the right-front passenger seat, but not in the driver's seat. Some information gathered by the car's sensors is displayed on a screen.

As of March 2026, Waymo has 3,000 robotaxis in service, provides 500,000 paid rides per week, and drives 4 million rider-only miles per week.

Service areas usually open at about 20–60 square miles (50–160 km^{2}) and are then expanded in steps; the area and population shown are for the current service area, not the area at launch. Areas have rarely been reduced. Airport and freeway access is announced separately (see below).

Service areas
Country	Region	Metro area	Status (Note: Waitlists are used to slowly roll out service.)	Launch date	Area served	Area	Population	Ref.
Canada	Ontario	Toronto	Service timeframe announced	2028	—	—	—	
Germany	Bavaria	Munich	Service timeframe announced	Late 2027	—	—	—	
Japan		Tokyo	Service timeframe announced	2027	—	—	—	
Singapore			Service timeframe announced	2028	—	—	—	
Spain	Madrid	Madrid	Service timeframe announced	2027	—	—	—	
United Kingdom	England	London	Service announced	—	—	—	—	
United States	Arizona	Phoenix	Full commercial service	October 8, 2020	List: Chandler; Gilbert; Guadalupe; Mesa; Paradise Valley; Phoenix; Queen Creek; Scottsdale; Tempe	353 sq mi (914 km^{2})	1,370,000	
United States	California	Los Angeles	Full commercial service	November 12, 2024	List: Alondra Park; Beverly Hills; Culver City; Del Aire; El Segundo; Gardena; Hawthorne; Hermosa Beach; Inglewood; Ladera Heights; Lawndale; Lennox; Lomita; Los Angeles; Manhattan Beach; Marina del Rey; Redondo Beach; Santa Monica; Torrance; View Park–Windsor Hills; West Athens; West Carson; West Hollywood; Westmont	213 sq mi (552 km^{2})	2,537,000	
United States	California	Sacramento	Service announced	—	—	—	—	
United States	California	San Diego	Full commercial service	October 14, 2026	List: San Diego	83 sq mi (215 km^{2})	554,000	
United States	California	San Francisco Bay Area	Full commercial service	June 25, 2024	List: Atherton; Baywood Park; Belmont; Brisbane; Broadmoor; Burbank; Burlingame; Cambrian Park; Campbell; Colma; Cupertino; Daly City; East Palo Alto; Emerald Lake Hills; Foster City; Fruitdale; Highlands; Hillsborough; Ladera; Los Altos; Los Altos Hills; Los Gatos; Loyola; Menlo Park; Millbrae; Monte Sereno; Mountain View; North Fair Oaks; Palo Alto; Portola Valley; Redwood City; San Bruno; San Carlos; San Francisco; San Jose; San Mateo; Santa Clara; Saratoga; South San Francisco; Stanford; Sunnyvale; West Menlo Park; Woodside	348 sq mi (901 km^{2})	2,624,000	
United States	Colorado	Denver	Waitlist service	September 1, 2026	List: Berkley; Commerce City; Denver; Edgewater; Glendale; Lakewood; North Washington; Sherrelwood; Twin Lakes; Welby	58 sq mi (150 km^{2})	347,000	
United States	Florida	Miami	Full commercial service	April 15, 2026	List: Aventura; Bal Harbour; Bay Harbor Islands; Biscayne Gardens; Biscayne Park; Brownsville; Coral Gables; Coral Terrace; Doral; Fontainebleau; Gladeview; Glenvar Heights; Hialeah; Indian Creek; Ives Estates; Miami; Miami Beach; Miami Gardens; Miami Shores; Miami Springs; North Bay Village; North Miami; North Miami Beach; Ojus; Opa-locka; Pinewood; South Miami; Sunny Isles Beach; Surfside; West Little River; West Miami; Westview	151 sq mi (391 km^{2})	1,079,000	
United States	Florida	Orlando	Full commercial service	April 15, 2026	List: Belle Isle; Conway; Edgewood; Meadow Woods; Oak Ridge; Orlando; Pine Castle; Southchase; Sky Lake; Taft; Tangelo Park; Williamsburg	118 sq mi (306 km^{2})	320,000	
United States	Florida	Tampa	Full commercial service	October 14, 2026	List: East Lake-Orient Park; Egypt Lake-Leto; Tampa; Town 'n' Country	45 sq mi (117 km^{2})	173,000	
United States	Georgia	Atlanta	Full commercial service with Uber	June 24, 2025	List: Atlanta; Brookhaven; Chamblee; College Park; Decatur; Druid Hills; East Point; Hapeville; North Decatur; North Druid Hills	112 sq mi (290 km^{2})	511,000	
United States	Illinois	Chicago	Service announced	—	—	—	—	
United States	Louisiana	New Orleans	Service timeframe announced	2026	—	—	—	
United States	Maryland	Baltimore	Service announced	—	—	—	—	
United States	Massachusetts	Boston	Service announced	—	—	—	—	
United States	Michigan	Detroit	Service timeframe announced	2026	—	—	—	
United States	Minnesota	Minneapolis	Service timeframe announced	2026	—	—	—	
United States	Missouri	St. Louis	Service announced	—	—	—	—	
United States	Nevada	Las Vegas	Waitlist service	September 14, 2026	List: Enterprise; Las Vegas; North Las Vegas; Paradise; Spring Valley; Winchester	47 sq mi (122 km^{2})	240,000	
United States	New Jersey	New York	Service announced	—	—	—	—	
United States	New York	Buffalo	Previously tested	—	—	—	—	(Note: Waymo has tested in Buffalo, but it is not listed on Waymo's service map as of May 2026.)
United States	New York	New York	Service announced	—	—	—	—	
United States	North Carolina	Charlotte	Service announced	—	—	—	—	
United States	Oregon	Portland	Service announced	—	—	—	—	
United States	Pennsylvania	Philadelphia	Service announced	—	—	—	—	
United States	Pennsylvania	Pittsburgh	Service announced	—	—	—	—	
United States	Tennessee	Nashville	Full commercial service	June 25, 2026	List: Berry Hill; Nashville; Oak Hill	79 sq mi (205 km^{2})	249,000	
United States	Texas	Austin	Full commercial service with Uber	March 4, 2025	List: Austin; Manchaca; Rollingwood; San Leanna; Shady Hollow; Sunset Valley; West Lake Hills	150 sq mi (388 km^{2})	648,000	
United States	Texas	Dallas	Full commercial service	August 4, 2026	List: Dallas; Highland Park; University Park	47 sq mi (122 km^{2})	281,000	
United States	Texas	Houston	Full commercial service	August 20, 2026	List: Houston; West University Place	50 sq mi (129 km^{2})	308,000	
United States	Texas	San Antonio	Full commercial service	October 14, 2026	List: Alamo Heights; Balcones Heights; Castle Hills; Olmos Park; San Antonio; Terrell Hills	59 sq mi (153 km^{2})	203,000	
United States	Washington	Seattle	Service announced	—	—	—	—	
United States	Washington, D.C.		Service timeframe announced	2026	—	—	—	

Airport service
Country	Region	Airport	Status	Launch date	Ref.
United States	Arizona	Mesa Gateway Airport	Service announced	—	
United States	Arizona	Phoenix Sky Harbor International Airport	Full commercial service	November 1, 2022	
United States	California	San Francisco International Airport	Waitlist service	January 29, 2026	
United States	California	San Jose International Airport	Full commercial service	December 1, 2025	
United States	Florida	Miami International Airport	Service announced	—	
United States	Florida	Orlando International Airport	Service announced	—	
United States	Florida	Tampa International Airport	Service announced	—	
United States	Nevada	Harry Reid International Airport	Waitlist service	October 21, 2026	
United States	New Jersey	Newark Liberty International Airport	Service announced	—	
United States	Tennessee	Nashville International Airport	Waitlist service	October 13, 2026	
United States	Texas	Austin–Bergstrom International Airport	Service announced	—	
United States	Texas	Dallas Love Field	Service announced	—	
United States	Texas	San Antonio International Airport	Full commercial service	October 14, 2026	

Other potential expansion:

- Australia: Waymo has contacted Transport for NSW and the federal Department of Infrastructure, Transport, Regional Development, Communications, Sport and the Arts.
- Canada:
  - Alberta: Waymo has lobbied the provincial government and the city of Calgary.
  - British Columbia: Waymo has hired lobbyists.
  - Ontario: Waymo lobbied the city of Ottawa in August 2026.
- France: Waymo established a subsidiary in June 2026.
- Germany:
  - Berlin: As of September 2026, Waymo is laying the groundwork for expansion.
- Netherlands: Waymo established a subsidiary in June 2026.
- South Korea: As of March 2026, Waymo is in contact with the Ministry of Land, Infrastructure and Transport.
- Switzerland: Waymo established a subsidiary in August 2026.
- United States:
  - Alaska: Waymo is testing in Fairbanks.
  - California:
    - Waymo communicated with officials from the city of Oakland and Oakland San Francisco Bay Airport in September 2025.
    - As of August 2026, Waymo has DMV and CPUC permission to drive autonomously in the entire nine-county San Francisco Bay Area plus the counties of Sacramento and Yolo, and in Southern California from Thousand Oaks to the Mexican border and east to I-15.
    - As of October 2026, Waymo is testing in Commerce.
  - Florida: Waymo met with the St. Petersburg Transportation department in August 2026.
  - Kentucky: As of September 2026, Waymo is mapping in Northern Kentucky.
  - New York: Waymo has conducted demonstrations in and lobbied state legislators from Syracuse.
  - North Carolina: Waymo had a "very preliminary" conversation with the city of Raleigh c. 2023, and publicly expressed interest in expanding to the Research Triangle in October 2026.
  - Ohio: As of September 2026, Waymo is mapping in Cincinnati.
  - Utah: Waymo communicated with state Senate Majority Leader Kirk Cullimore Jr. in 2026.
  - Virginia: Waymo started mapping Arlington and Alexandria in May 2026.

=== Public transit ===
In September 2025, Waymo and the city of Chandler, Arizona, announced that Waymo would be integrated into Chandler's public microtransit service.

=== Trucking ===
In 2020 Waymo launched a self-driving truck development division designated as Waymo Via, to work with OEMs to integrate its technology into commercial vehicles. The company began testing Class 8 tractor-trailers in 2018 in Atlanta, expanding in 2019 to southwest shipping routes across Arizona, California, New Mexico and Texas. The company opened a trucking hub in Dallas, Texas in 2021. It partnered with Daimler to integrate autonomous technology into a fleet of Freightliner Cascadia trucks. Waymo operated 48 Class 8 autonomous trucks with safety drivers.

Waymo tested its technology in commercial delivery vehicles with United Parcel Service. In July 2020 Waymo and Stellantis expanded their partnership, including the development of Ram ProMaster delivery vehicles.

In July 2023, Waymo announced that it was moving away from commercial development of self-driving trucks to focus on the ride-hailing Waymo business, and shuttered the Waymo Via trucking program. The vast majority of employees who were on Waymo's trucking team moved to other roles within the company.

=== Delivery ===
Waymo has partnered with Uber Eats and DoorDash to deliver food.

=== Road maintenance ===
Waymo data is used by local governments for pothole detection.

== Technology ==
=== Hardware ===
Google has invested heavily in matrix multiplication and video processing hardware such as the Tensor Processing Unit (TPU) to augment Nvidia's graphics processing units (GPUs) and Intel's central processing units (CPUs) used in Waymo vehicles.

Waymo manufactures a suite of self-driving hardware developed in-house. This includes sensors and hardware-enhanced vision system, lidar, and radar. Sensors give 360-degree views while lidar detects objects up to 300 metres (980 ft) away. Short-range lidar images objects near the vehicle, and radar is used to see around other vehicles and track objects in motion.

=== Software ===
Waymo uses a deep-learning architecture called VectorNet to predict vehicle trajectories in complex traffic scenarios. It uses a graph neural network to model the interactions between vehicles and has demonstrated state-of-the-art performance on several benchmark datasets for trajectory prediction.

Waymo Carcraft is a virtual world in which Waymo simulates driving conditions. The simulator was named after the video game World of Warcraft. With Carcraft, 25,000 virtual self-driving cars navigate through models of Austin, Texas; Mountain View, California; Phoenix, Arizona; and other cities.

=== Vehicles ===
Manufacturer and Model	Driver generation	Announcement Date	Introduction in Fleet	Status
Chrysler Pacifica (minivan) Plug-in hybrid	4	December 2016	November 2017 in Phoenix: testing with safety driver. October 2020 in Phoenix: Waymo's first publicly offered Robotaxi service.	All vehicles are retired as of March 2023. This was the first vehicle that offered public Robotaxi service in the USA. It was also used in mapping and testing in many locations where Waymo later started service with other vehicles.
Jaguar I-Pace	5	March 2018	August 2021 in San Francisco.	Total order of 3,500 vehicles, the last of which are entering service during 2026.
Zeekr / Waymo Ojai (based on Zeekr Mix)	6	December 2021	February 2026 in San Francisco and Los Angeles: Driverless testing service only for Waymo employees. In August 2026, Ojai became available to the general public in San Francisco, Los Angeles and Phoenix.	In revenue service, with the fleet to expand to "thousands" by the end of 2026.
Hyundai Ioniq 5	6	October 2024	Starting in 2028, Hyundai plans to deliver 50,000 units to Waymo.	
Toyota bZ4X	6	October 2026		

As of October 2024, Morgan Stanley estimated the total vehicle cost at over $120,000, and another source estimated $150,000. As of June 2025, a third source estimates it to be above $100,000. Other costs include ride monitors, service personnel, and real estate for storing and servicing the vehicles.

In February 2026, Waymo's chief safety officer confirmed that the company employs remote assistance workers in the United States and the Philippines to address situations that the vehicles cannot independently solve. The company stated that the remote workers do not drive the vehicles, simply providing guidance to the vehicle, which can accept or reject it.

== Operations, efficiency, and safety ==
From California Public Utilities Commission (CPUC) data, as of September 2025, Waymo delivered 4.75 million Passenger Miles Traveled (PMT) monthly, which required 6.57 million Vehicle Miles Traveled (VMT). This is a threefold growth from September 2024 in both PMT and VMT, with the ratio staying roughly equal.

Vehicles have an average passenger occupancy of 0.75. In 70% of the trips, only one passenger is in the car. For 44% of miles, the vehicle is empty, and 4.6% of requested trips are cancelled.

In 2024, Waymo and insurance company Swiss Re published a study which estimated that Waymo generated 92% fewer bodily injury claims and 88% fewer property damage claims than human drivers over the same number of miles in the same locations. The study said that by the end of 2024, the company faced two potential bodily injury claims (accidents where the Waymo vehicle was potentially at fault) and estimated that human drivers would have generated 26 bodily injury claims. For property damage claims, Waymo logged nine versus an estimated 78 for human drivers. Experts noted that the sample size in the study of 25 million miles driven is extremely small (0.0008%), compared to the 3 trillion miles logged annually by human drivers in the US.

A July 2026 study by the Insurance Institute for Highway Safety compared AVs from Waymo to human drivers from 2021 to 2024 in the US states of Arizona, California, and Texas, and found that the total AV crash rate per vehicle-miles traveled was 68% lower than the human driver rate, the single-vehicle crash rate was 85% lower, and the rate of crashes which caused injury or fatality was 81% lower (though many times the AVs had no people on board to be injured). In crashes serious enough to report to police, the Waymo vehicle was at fault in 8% of cases, and in another 8% of cases fault was unclear. The AVs did not operate on interstate highways during the study period.

== Incidents and controversies ==
=== Accidents ===
In July 2021, the National Highway Traffic Safety Administration (NHTSA) started requiring autonomous vehicle companies to report any accidents which result in injury or property damage that occur within 30 seconds of the vehicle operating in autonomous mode. As of August 17, 2026, the (NHTSA) has logged 2,308 accidents (cumulative since July 2021), involving Waymo vehicles. From July 2021 to January 2025, Waymo's vehicles have been involved in about 30 accidents with injuries, though the NHTSA reports do not ascribe fault.

Notable Waymo accidents include:

- In May 2023, a Waymo hit and killed a dog which ran out into the street in front of the car. According to Waymo, its car detected the dog, while the human safety driver did not, and that whether the vehicle would take evasive maneuvers or not depends on the expected trajectory of the dog. Waymo compares the performance of its autonomous systems to a theoretical Non-Impaired, with Eyes Always ON the conflict (NIEON) human driver's expected performance.
- On December 11, 2023, two Waymo cars hit a tow truck minutes apart from each other; Waymo recalled its software in response.
- On February 6, 2024, a Waymo hit and injured a cyclist who was obstructed behind an oncoming truck.
- On May 21, 2024, a Waymo hit a utility pole; Waymo recalled its software in response.
- On January 19, 2025, an empty Waymo was stopped in a line of cars when a speeding driver rear-ended the line, killing a passenger and a dog in another car; this was the first fatal crash involving Waymo.
- On February 16, 2025, a cyclist was hospitalized after being doored by a Waymo passenger; the cyclist sued Waymo, alleging that it had stopped in an unsafe location and failed to warn the passengers before exiting.
- On September 14, 2025, near Arizona State University in Tempe, a motorcyclist rear-ended an empty Waymo that, according to Waymo, was turning right and yielding to a pedestrian. Less than a second later, a separate vehicle struck the motorcyclist and fled the scene. The motorcyclist died at the hospital, and police later tracked down the other driver.
- On October 27, 2025, a Waymo in San Francisco hit and killed KitKat, a local bodega cat, after he darted under the car as it was pulling away. In response, Supervisor Jackie Fielder called for the state to pass legislation allowing local governments to ban self-driving cars.
- On November 30, 2025, a Waymo hit and killed a dog. According to the dog's owner, Waymo failed to notice what had happened and continued on after the collision.
- On January 23, 2026, a Waymo hit a child crossing the street, who suffered minor injures. The NHTSA opened an investigation into Waymo. According to Waymo and the NTSB, the child was obscured behind an SUV, and the Waymo car braked but was unable to avoid contact.
- On August 7, 2026, in Dallas, a man was crossing a street at 11:30 p.m. when he was struck by an SUV and thrown 30 feet, where he was struck by an unoccupied Waymo vehicle traveling in the opposite direction. He was taken to the hospital where he died.

=== Legal and political disputes ===
- In January 2022, Waymo sued the California Department of Motor Vehicles (DMV) to prevent data on driverless crashes from being released to the public. Waymo maintained that such information constituted a trade secret. According to The Los Angeles Times, the "topics Waymo wants to keep hidden include how it plans to handle driverless car emergencies, what it would do if a robot taxi started driving itself where it wasn't supposed to go, and what constraints there are on the car's ability to traverse San Francisco's tunnels, tight curves and steep hills." The court ruled some details regarding safety records do not have to be released.
- In January 2024, the city attorney of San Francisco attempted to sue to prevent expansion of driverless vehicles including Waymo into San Francisco. The San Mateo County government soon after also sent a letter to regulators opposing expansion to its county.
- In May 2024, the NHTSA launched an investigation into potential flaws in Waymo vehicles, focusing on 31 incidents that included Waymo vehicles ramming into a closing gate, driving on the wrong side of the road, and at least 17 crashes or fires. Waymo recalled its self-driving software in May 2025. The investigation was closed in July 2025 with no further action taken.
- In June 2024, a Phoenix police officer pulled over an empty Waymo that, according to dispatch records, had run a red light and driven into a lane of oncoming traffic. The records said the officer was "unable to issue citation to computer". Waymo said the car had encountered inconsistent construction signage.
- In July 2025, anti-Waymo protestors in Boston were joined by city officials, who expressed concerns over safety and the impact on rideshare drivers. Eight city councillors proposed an ordinance to restrict self-driving car services in Boston, with one provision requiring safety drivers.
- In September 2025, police in San Bruno, California pulled over a Waymo after it made an illegal U-turn.
- In November 2025, a man sued Waymo after he was falsely identified as a terrorist on the Specially Designated Nationals and Blocked Persons List and denied access to Waymo. He later dropped the case.
- In November 2025, New Jersey State Senator Andrew Zwicker proposed a bill to require a three-year pilot project for self-driving cars, with a safety driver present at all times; Waymo opposes the bill.
- In November 2025, San Diego City Council member Sean Elo-Rivera opposed Waymo expansion, citing the impact on taxi and rideshare drivers. In January 2026, the board of the San Diego Metropolitan Transit System passed a resolution opposing Waymo expansion.
- In November 2025, the city of Santa Monica, California banned Waymo from charging its vehicles between 11 pm and 6 am, claiming that two of their charging stations are public nuisances, due to complaints from nearby residents about noise and light pollution. Waymo continued using the stations, and sued the city in an attempt to overturn the nuisance declaration. In July 2026, the court issued a preliminary injunction in the city's favor, but the injunction was overturned in September 2026.
- In February 2026, Senator Ed Markey opened an investigation into how autonomous vehicle companies, including Waymo, use remote assistance operators. He warned that overseas operations could create safety, national security and privacy risks. In March 2026, Markey said the companies' responses showed Waymo was the only one using overseas remote operators: about half of its roughly 70 on-duty agents were based in the Philippines. He accused the industry of "a stunning lack of transparency" and asked the NHTSA to investigate its remote assistance practices.
- In February 2026, New York Governor Kathy Hochul dropped a budget proposal that would have allowed commercial robotaxi services in cities outside New York City, citing a lack of support in the state legislature. Waymo's permits to test in New York City expired on March 31, 2026, ending its testing there. Mayor Zohran Mamdani said the city was "committed to delivering for the workers who keep the city running", including taxi drivers, and the Transport Workers Union criticized Waymo's safety record and the risk to drivers' jobs.
- In February 2026, D.C. Council member Janeese Lewis George opposed Waymo expansion into Washington, D.C. Lewis George reiterated her opposition in October 2026, citing potential job losses for drivers.
- In October 2026, the Minneapolis City Council approved a resolution requiring human drivers in robotaxis, in response to Waymo testing in Minneapolis. Mayor Jacob Frey vetoed the resolution, and the City Council failed to override the veto.
- In November 2026, the California Department of Motor Vehicles ordered Waymo to suspend freeway operations after two incidents, one where Waymo cars drove through a construction zone, and another where a Waymo car tried to overtake a police car performing a traffic break.

=== School bus incidents ===
In September 2025, a Waymo in Atlanta was recorded illegally passing a stopped school bus. Georgia State Representative Clint Crowe and State Senator Rick Williams criticized Waymo, with Williams stating his support for higher fines for self-driving cars.

- The NHTSA opened a preliminary evaluation on October 17, 2025, into Waymo’s automated driving system following an incident involving a stopped school bus in Atlanta.
- Austin Independent School District (AISD) revealed that Waymo cars had illegally passed its school buses 20 times from the start of the school year to December 1, and asked Waymo to stop its operations during school drop-off and pick-up hours, but Waymo refused.
- Atlanta Public Schools later revealed six illegal passing incidents.
- Waymo recalled its self-driving software on December 8.
- As of January 15, 2026, AISD has reported four violations since the recall.
- On January 23, 2026, the National Transportation Safety Board (NTSB) announced an investigation into incidents involving Waymo vehicles passing stopped school buses in Austin.
- In a preliminary report released on March 3, 2026, the NTSB stated that a Waymo vehicle initially stopped for an Austin school bus on January 12, then requested remote assistance. A remote assistance agent incorrectly indicated that the bus’s signals were inactive, and the vehicle proceeded past the bus while its stop arms remained extended. No collision occurred.
- The NTSB launched another investigation following an incident on March 25.
- On November 6, 2026, the NHTSA opened a recall query covering 2,895 Waymo vehicles to assess whether the December 2025 school bus recall had fixed the problem. The agency said a majority of the incidents identified in its earlier investigation had occurred after the remedy was completed on November 17, 2025.

=== Vandalism ===
In 2018, after the death of Elaine Herzberg — the first recorded case of a pedestrian fatality involving a self-driving car (an Uber test vehicle) — there were several cases of Waymo cars being vandalized.

In 2023, the San Francisco group Safe Street Rebel used a practice called "coning" to trap Waymo and Cruise cars with traffic cones as a form of protest after stating that the cars had been involved in hundreds of incidents.

In February 2024, during Lunar New Year celebrations in Chinatown, San Francisco, a mob of vandals attacked, graffitied, and set fire to a Waymo car. No one was injured.

In February 2024, a pair of Waymo passengers described an attack by an onlooker who attempted to cover the car's sensors.

In July 2024, Waymo sued two people who allegedly vandalized their cars.

During the June 2025 Los Angeles protests against mass deportation, several Waymo cars were set on fire when riots broke out. Officials including California Governor Gavin Newsom and Los Angeles Mayor Karen Bass condemned the destruction, attributing it to extremists infiltrating otherwise-peaceful protests.

=== Use of camera footage by police ===
Waymo has been criticized for law enforcement agencies' use of its camera footage. According to Waymo, it "does not provide information or data to law enforcement without a valid legal request".

In July 2026, the San Mateo Police Department had stated that Waymo had reported to them that 15-year-old passengers were drinking alcohol and firing a black gun from inside the vehicle towards other vehicles. A Waymo employee remotely monitoring the car brought it to a halt in a parking lot where police were waiting. The gun turned out to be a toy gun painted black, and the projectiles were Orbeez pellets. The district attorney’s office is reviewing whether to press charges, including underage drinking and engaging in threatening behavior.

In November 2026, an Arizona's Family investigation found that 43 of the 88 Waymo crashes reported to police in metro Phoenix from September 2020 to December 2024 were hit-and-runs. Most of those cases went unsolved, and in several of them police repeatedly asked Waymo for video but never received it. Waymo said it generally requires a warrant or court order before sharing footage with police, and that its policy is to "challenge, limit, or reject requests that do not have a valid legal basis or are overbroad".

=== Relationship with emergency services ===
There have been many incidents of Waymo cars impeding or disobeying emergency services. In June 2023, San Francisco Fire Chief Jeanine Nicholson said Waymo and Cruise robotaxis were "not ready for prime time", citing at least 39 department reports that year of robotaxis interfering with firefighters, such as blocking firehouse driveways and parking on a fire hose. The San Francisco Fire Department reported 31 incidents between April 2025 and June 2026. In late November 2025, a Waymo carrying a passenger drove through an intersection in downtown Los Angeles where officers were making a high-risk felony arrest after a stolen-vehicle pursuit. The LAPD said officers had not yet blocked off traffic and that the incident did not affect its tactics. In one high-profile incident in March 2026, Waymo car in Austin attempted to make a U-turn but ended up stuck and blocked an ambulance responding to a mass shooting; Waymo later declined to attend a public meeting about the incident. In October 2026, California passed a law allowing the state to fine robotaxi companies for impeding emergency services.

Waymo has also been criticized for calling 911 on unresponsive passengers, most of whom have simply fallen asleep. Austin reported nearly 100 incidents in 2025, with only 3% actually requiring medical transport. Austin officials stated that San Francisco had 250 similar episodes in 2025.

=== Other incidents ===
- In 2021, it was noted that Waymo cars kept routing through the Richmond District of San Francisco, with up to 50 cars each day driving to a dead-end street before turning around.
- In August 2024, residents of San Francisco's SoMa district began to complain about noise pollution from Waymo vehicles honking at each other in a local parking lot. Residents reported hearing the car horns daily, with activity levels varying and usually peaking around 4 AM and during evening rush hour. The honking appears to have been triggered by the self-driving cars backing in and out of the lot. The story caught attention after a resident began live streaming the cars. Waymo apologized and said the issue will be addressed with software updates.
- In December 2024, a Waymo car drove in circles around a parking lot with a passenger inside, which took several minutes to resolve remotely. Waymo says it has fixed the issue.
- In October and December 2024, Waymo passengers in San Francisco reported being harassed while riding. In October, a woman posted a video showing two men stopping her Waymo and pressuring her for her phone number. In a December report, riders said they had been followed by other cars or approached while stopped, and that the vehicle could not easily be rerouted. Waymo said such events were rare and that riders can reach Rider Support and request a pull-over.
- In March 2025, city records showed that Waymo vehicles had received 589 parking citations in San Francisco in 2024, totaling $65,065 in fines, for violations such as obstructing traffic and street-cleaning restrictions. Waymo said it was working to address the problem.
  - A Waymo car got stuck in a drive-thru.
  - A Waymo passenger reported being trapped in the car after it drove the wrong way and stopped in the middle of the road. According to Waymo, one passenger pressed the "pull over" button, and passengers could have unlocked the doors by pulling the door handle twice.
- In April 2025, an unreleased version of Waymo's privacy policy, found by researcher Jane Manchun Wong, showed the company preparing to let riders opt out of having interior camera data linked to their identity used to train generative AI models. It also said Waymo may share data to tailor ads. Waymo said there were "no plans" to use the data for targeted ads.
- In December 2025:
  - A "minor collision" between two Waymo cars blocked an intersection.
  - A Waymo passenger found a person hiding in the trunk of the car; Waymo was criticized for not having a system to detect this.
  - A Waymo car got stuck on a bridge in the Venice Canal Historic District in Los Angeles during a parade.
  - A Waymo car drove the wrong way on a one-way street.
  - Waymo cars became inoperable during a large-scale power outage in San Francisco, blocking traffic and intersections. In response, Waymo temporarily halted ride-hailing services until power was restored. Authorities expressed concern that similar behavior during a disaster would block emergency responders and residents fleeing danger.
- In January 2026:
  - A Waymo car drove on newly-built tracks of the Phoenix Valley Metro Rail.
  - A burglar used a Waymo as a getaway car; the case was still unsolved as of June 2026.
- In February 2026, the Teamsters of California called on the California Public Utilities Commission to indefinitely suspend Waymo's license to operate in the state, citing safety and job concerns, less than two weeks after a Waymo struck a child near a Santa Monica school. Waymo said it was committed to improving road safety.
  - A Waymo stopped between the train and the bar gate at a railroad crossing.
  - In Houston, video obtained by ABC13 showed a Waymo trying to enter a downtown HOV lane the wrong way during rush hour and blocking traffic. The station also reported that neighbors in the Fifth Ward said Waymo vehicles stopping near a railroad crossing could block in other drivers.
  - A Waymo car drove the wrong way in a school zone.
  - Waymo paused its operations in San Antonio after a car was swept away during a flood. The shutdown lasted until September 2026. Waymo recalled their robotaxis over this issue.
  - A Waymo car got stuck in Broadway, and had to get moved off the road by Metro Police
  - A Waymo car drove off with a passenger's luggage in the trunk.
  - A Waymo test vehicle drove into a police cordon at a crime scene in Harlesden, London. Waymo apologized and said the car was in manual mode with a validation driver in full control; the driver was suspended pending an investigation.
  - In Miami, a Waymo stopped in traffic after a police cruiser with its lights on drove nearby. Miami Police said the car likely misread the situation as a traffic stop, and officers reported the issue to Waymo.
  - Dozens of Waymo cars without passengers were seen circling around cul-de-sacs in Atlanta for hours at a time for several weeks. Waymo released a statement to WSB-TV claiming that these incidents were caused by a problem with their "routing behavior" and that Waymo was looking into the matter.
  - Waymo paused its service in Atlanta, Dallas, Houston, Austin, and Nashville due to flooding; service from San Antonio remained paused from the previous month.
  - From San Mateo to San Francisco, a Waymo car exceeded the speed limit on a highway through a construction zone, was chased by police, and left the highway for a residential neighborhood. Waymo paused freeway rides in the United States to address the problems.
- In June 2026:
  - Waymo recalled its software after a series incidents involving cars driving into construction zones on freeways.
  - A Waymo car drove in an oncoming traffic lane.
- In July 2026:
  - On July 4 in San Francisco, a Waymo car caught fire after driving over lit fireworks, and several Waymo vehicles ran out of energy in a traffic jam and had to be towed, further exacerbating the traffic jam.
  - In San Bruno, residents said Waymo vehicles were dropping off passengers headed to San Francisco International Airport on a residential street, and parking across driveways. Waymo said it had remedied the situation and noted that its SFO drop-off points are the Rental Car Center and the Grand Hyatt, which require an AirTrain ride to reach the terminals.
- In August 2026, a wheelchair user filed a petition with Nevada regulators arguing that Waymo's Nevada rollout violates state law because it had not arranged wheelchair-accessible alternatives. Waymo said it would comply with Nevada's accessibility requirements.
- On September 20, 2026, a driverless Waymo drove around barricades and through the South Pearl Street Farmers Market in Denver while vendors were setting up; market staff walked ahead of it to warn vendors, and no one was injured. Waymo said it was dedicated to learning from the situation.
- In October 2026, the city of Commerce increased overnight patrols after residents complained about Waymo vehicles parking on and driving through residential streets. The city said the vehicles were conducting training runs and that it cannot prohibit state-authorized autonomous vehicles from using public streets.
- In November 2026, a Waymo car drove through the bar gate at a San Diego Trolley crossing.
- On November 18, 2026, Waymo paused its service in San Francisco during heavy rain, after videos showed its vehicles stopped on flooded streets, including one stalled in a flooded crosswalk.

== See also ==
- History of self-driving cars
- Tesla Robotaxi
