= Baywood Park, California =

The following places in California are named Baywood Park:

- Baywood Park, San Luis Obispo County, California
- Baywood Park, San Mateo County, California
