= Tekedra Mawakana =

American businesswoman and lawyer

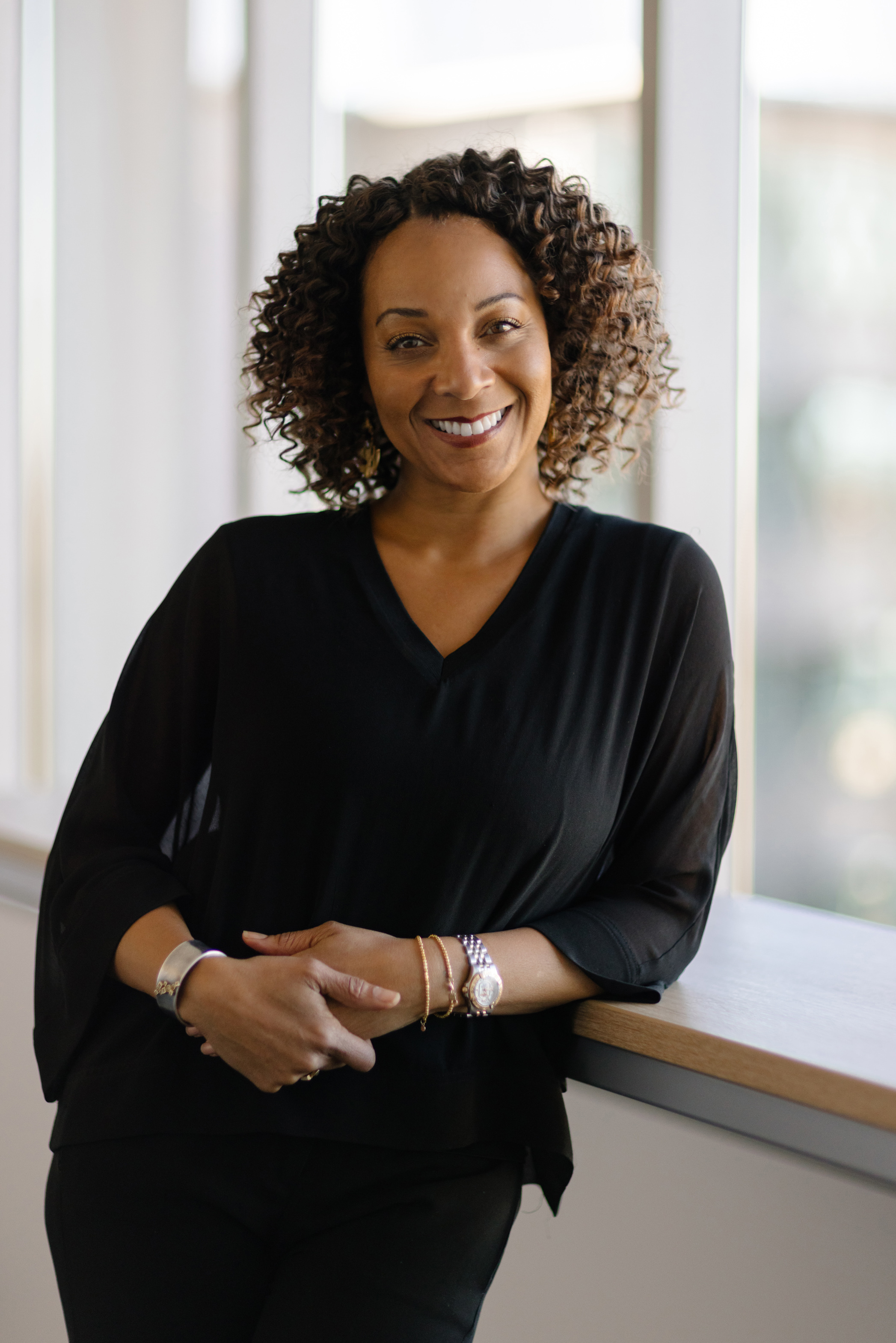
- Mawakana in 2024
- Born: 1971 (age 54–55); Mississippi, US
- Education: Trinity Washington University (BA); Columbia Law School (JD)
- Title: Co-CEO of Waymo

Tekedra Nzinga Mawakana (formerly Jefferson; née McGee; born 1971) is an American businesswoman and lawyer and is the co-chief executive officer of Waymo. Previously, she was the company's chief operating officer, and prior employers have included Steptoe & Johnson, AOL, Yahoo!, and eBay. Mawakana has been on the boards of the Consumer Technology Association, the Global Network Initiative, the Internet Association, Boom Supersonic, Operator Collective, and Intuit.

== Early life and education ==
Tekedra Mawakana was born in Mississippi and later resided in Georgia, Texas, and Virginia.

Mawakana received her Bachelor of Arts degree in political science from Trinity Washington University in 1993, before earning her Juris Doctor from Columbia Law School.

== Career ==
Mawakana began her career at Steptoe & Johnson, an international law firm based in Washington, D.C., where she focused on intellectual property and telecommunication. She then held a corporate counsel position at the "mid-size Washington-area" telecommunications company Startec Global Communications. Mawakana later held policy roles in legal departments at AOL and Yahoo! She worked at AOL for approximately twelve years before becoming Yahoo!'s deputy general counsel in 2013, where she led the Washington, D.C. office and efforts to combat mass surveillance. She then was eBay's head of global government relations for 14 months, starting in 2016.

Mawakana joined Waymo as vice president of public policy and government affairs in 2017. In this role, she focused on expanding autonomous driving testing, regulation, and competition with traditional automobile manufacturers. Mawakana was promoted to chief operating officer in 2019, overseeing the company's communications and marketing, business development and operations, corporate social responsibility, and public relations and policy. Mawakana has been co-chief executive officer (CEO) of Waymo since April 2021. Her role focuses on business, while co-CEO Dmitri Dolgov concentrates on technology. In 2021, Pete Bigelow of Automotive News said the duo have a "somewhat unusual power-sharing arrangement", and have "developed a close working relationship and have been heavily involved in Waymo's most high-profile milestones". She is the second African American woman to head a self-driving technology company.

=== Board membership and recognition ===
Mawakana is on the Consumer Technology Association's board of industry leaders, on Boom Supersonic's advisory council, and Intuit's board of directors. She is also on the advisory board of the investment company Operator Collective, as well as the board of advocacy group Saving Promise, which works to prevent domestic violence. Mawakana has also been chair of the Internet Association and on the board of the Global Network Initiative.

In 2015, Mawakana was included in Washingtonian magazine's list of "100 Top Tech Leaders", in which she was noted for her work at Yahoo! to "protect the privacy of users" against surveillance by the National Security Agency. She was included in Automotive News' 2020 list of "100 leading women" in the North American automotive industry for her work at Waymo.

In 2024 TIME magazine listed Mawakana among 100 most influential people in AI.

== Personal life ==
Mawakana lives in the San Francisco Bay Area. She was previously married to Kemit Mawakana (formerly Samuel Jefferson). They divorced in 2021.

== See also ==
- List of Columbia Law School alumni
