= Waymo Ojai =

Robotaxi operated by Waymo

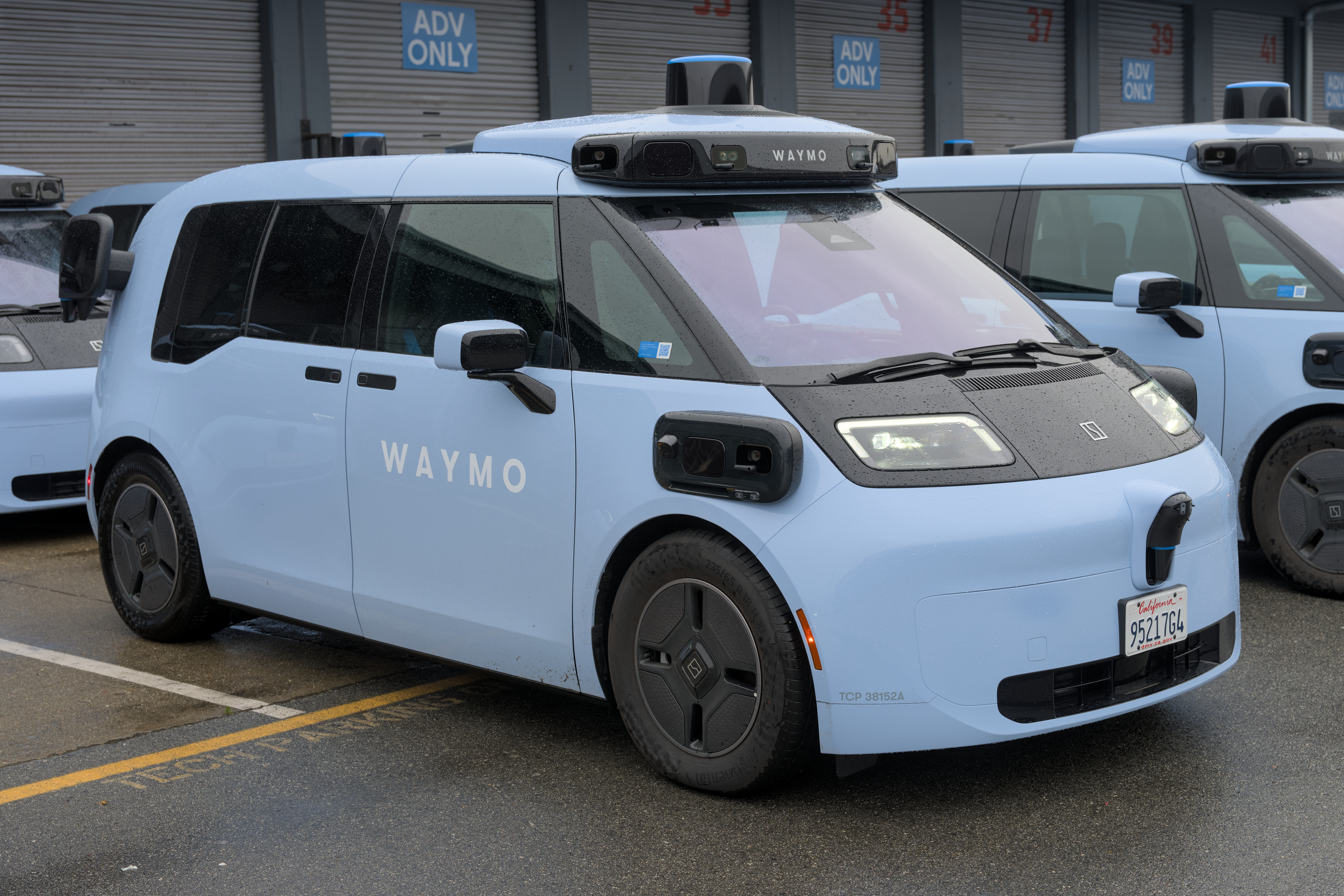

Overview
- Manufacturer: Zeekr
- Model code: CM1e
- Also called: Zeekr M-Vision (concept)
- Production: December 2024 – present
- Assembly: Vehicle assembly: China: Ningbo, Zhejiang; Final assembly: United States: Mesa, Arizona

Body and chassis
- Class: Driverless vehicle
- Body style: 4-door minivan
- Layout: Rear-motor, rear-wheel-drive
- Platform: Sustainable Experience Architecture (SEA-M)
- Related: Zeekr Mix

Powertrain
- Electric motor: Permanent magnet synchronous
- Power output: 268 hp (200 kW; 272 PS)
- Battery: 93 kWh Li-ion

The Waymo Ojai is a battery electric robotaxi manufactured by Zeekr for Waymo since December 2024 and in passenger service since May 2026.

== Overview ==
The Ojai serves as Waymo's sixth-generation robotaxi and is the first Waymo vehicle to use its sixth generation Waymo Driver system that makes use of updated sensors and a high-resolution 17-megapixel imager that is capable of capturing millions of data points. Zeekr builds the vehicles that serve as the base of the Ojai in Ningbo, Zhejiang, China, and they are later shipped to Mesa, Arizona, United States to be outfitted with Waymo's technology.

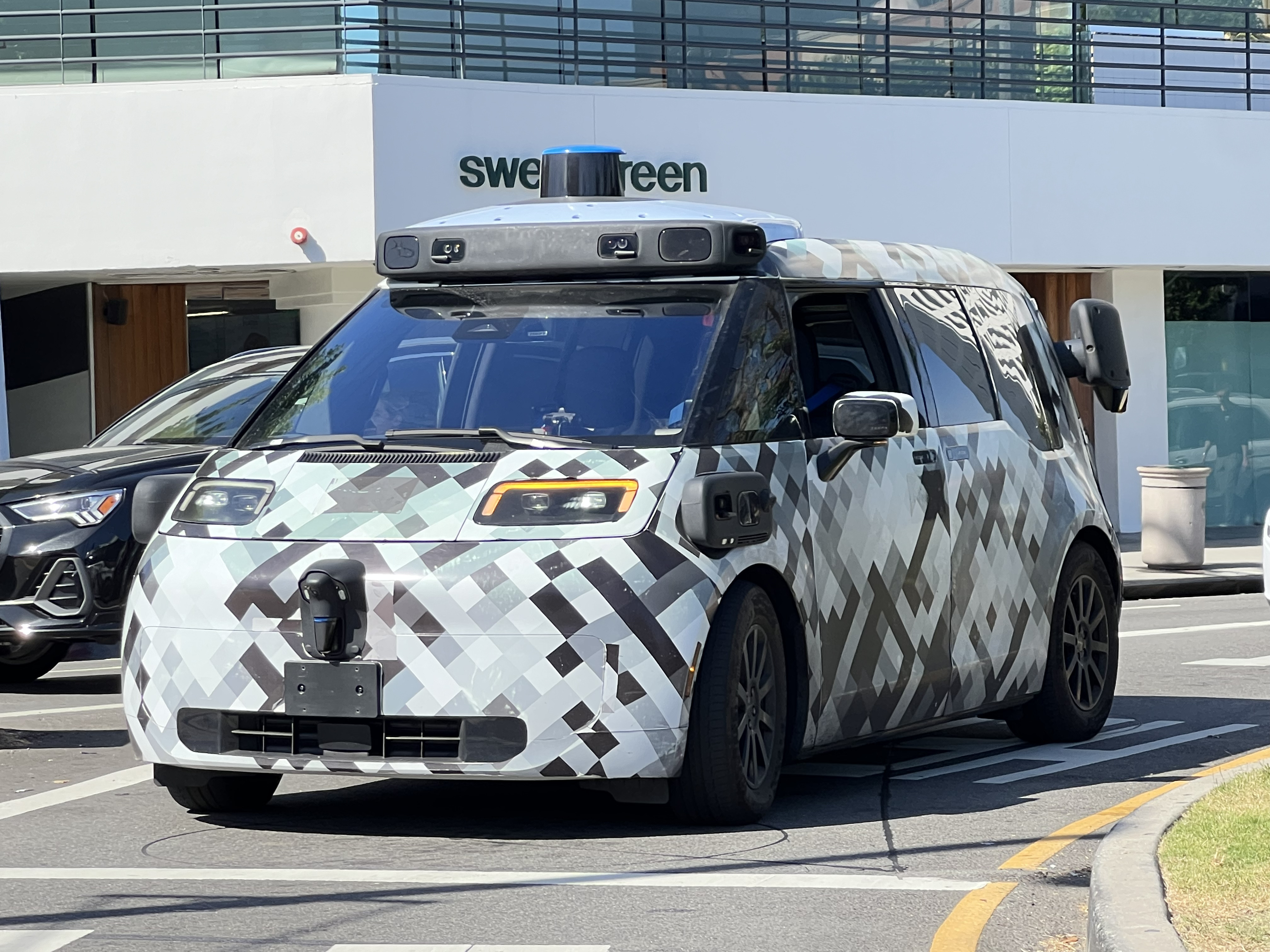
Prototype Ojai undergoing testing in 2025

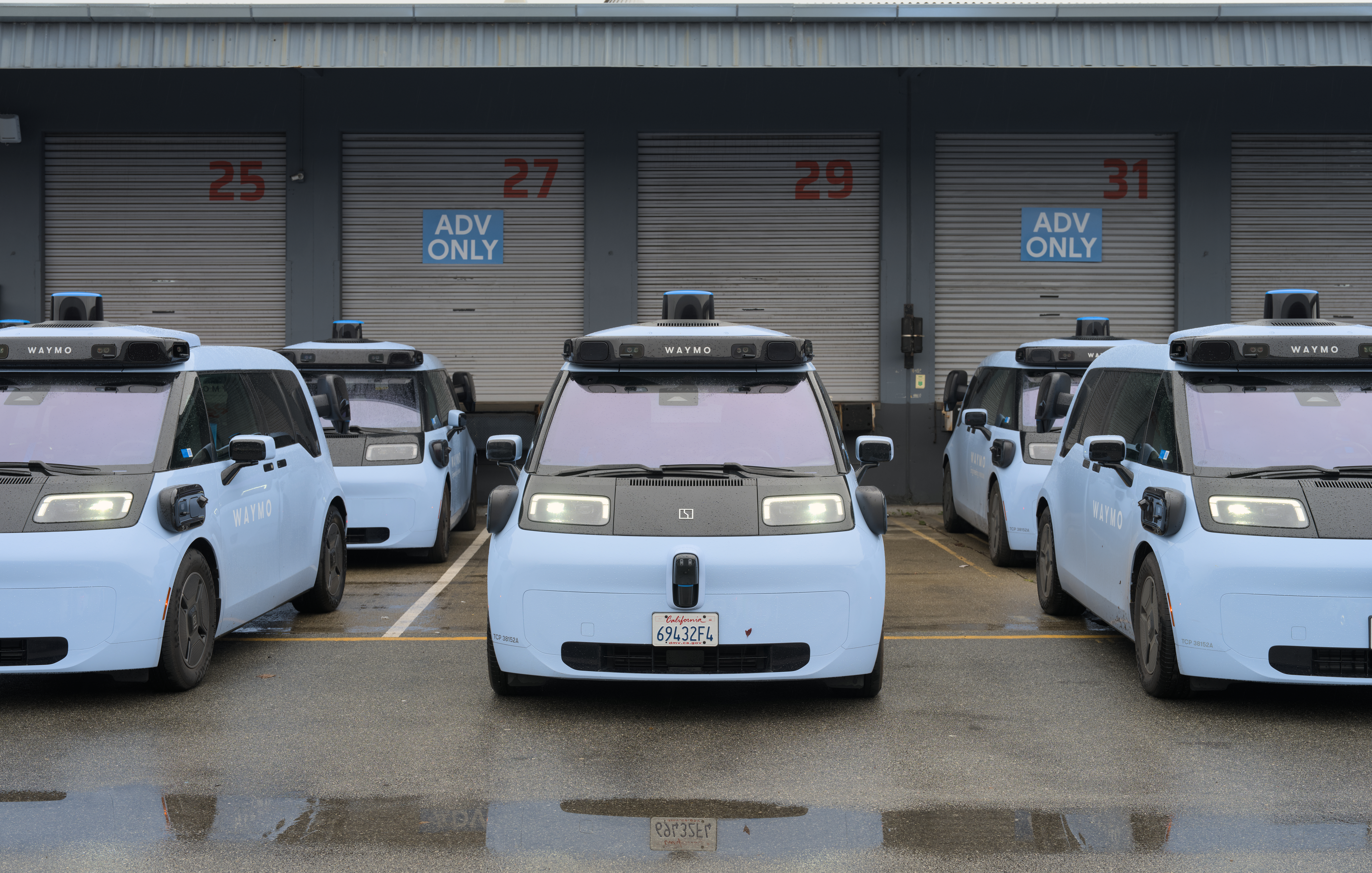
Multiple out-of-service Ojai taxis parked at Waymo's Bayshore Depot

=== Design ===
The Ojai features a boxy general design using a lower step and higher ceiling than that of the existing Waymo robotaxis. It also uses a similar size to that of the Jaguar i-Pace robotaxis. It keeps the same design of that of the M-Vision concept that previewed the robotaxi. It uses a capsule-style design with a low floor and an axis-length ratio of 64%. The Ojai does not use a B-pillar, similar to the related Zeekr Mix.

The seating is 2+3 as in regular cars, with the driver seat unusable for passengers, meaning that only four people can take a ride together, one of which can sit in the front (passenger seat).

=== Features ===
For autonomous driving, the Ojai features 6 radar sensors, 4 LiDAR sensors, and over 13 cameras. The Ojai uses 10 windshield wipers to clean its sensors. The windshield wipers used to clean the pods housing the sensors are not allowed to be more than 3 in (76 mm) long. It does not use a rear windshield wiper and is also equipped with 2 full-size wipers at the front.

== Powertrain ==
Certification documents from the National Highway Traffic Safety Administration show that the Ojai uses a motor producing 268 horsepower (200 kW; 272 PS) and 252 pound-feet (342 N⋅m) paired with a 93 kWh lithium-ion battery. No official range figure has been published. It uses an 800-volt architecture.

== History ==
=== 2021 ===
On December 28, 2021, it was announced that Waymo and Zeekr would be collaborating on a robotaxi that would be developed by Geely's Gothenburg-based subsidiary Zeekr Technology Europe, then known as China Euro Vehicle Technology AB. At the time of the announcement, Waymo used robotaxis based on the Chrysler Pacifica Hybrid and the Jaguar i-Pace. On the same day of the announcement, three images were released as teasers for the then-unnamed robotaxi.

=== 2022 ===
A prototype version of the Ojai, then unnamed, was first spotted during winter testing in Sweden being operated with a driver and a passenger in March of 2022. More spyshots of prototype versions came to light in November 2022, this time with some autonomous driving equipment. This was likely because Waymo was aiming for SAE Level 4 autonomy.

==== Zeekr M-Vision ====
The Zeekr M-Vision concept car was unveiled on November 17, 2022, serving as a preview for the Ojai. It was also announced on the same day that mass production would begin in 2024. Also confirmed was that the platform used by the unnamed taxi would be the SEA-M, a variant of Geely's Sustainable Experience Architecture introduced the year prior by the Zeekr 001.

=== 2023 ===
Waymo retired their fleet of Pacifica Hybrids in late March 2023 in a transition to an all-electric fleet and to make way for the then-unnamed Zeekr robotaxi. Waymo also retired their fourth-generation technology with the retiring of the Pacifica fleet. The Pacificas were in use for 5 years, being first introduced on November 7, 2017.

=== 2024 ===
Sometime in the first half of 2024, it was revealed that the Zeekr robotaxi had the possibility of being hit with tariffs as there was a 102.5% tariff on electric vehicles imported from China during the Biden Administration. Waymo had just received the first few units at that time.

The Ojai was announced on August 19, 2024, initially without a name. Waymo had also promised that the 6th generation robotaxi would honk less compared to the fifth generation taxis. More tests took place after the official announcement.

Production of the base vehicles officially began in December of 2024.

=== 2025 ===
The Ojai was officially unveiled at the Consumer Electronics Show in January 2025. At the same time the robotaxi was given the name Zeekr RT for the time being. Final assembly for the robotaxis in order to implement the Waymo technology began in Mesa, Arizona later in the year.

==== Recall ====
A single robotaxi was recalled a total of 3 times in February 2025 for failing to meet several Federal Motor Vehicle Safety Standards inspections, with Zeekr issuing a physical stop in the passenger seat rail to resolve the first recall, updating the software of said robotaxi for the second recall, and fit new C-pillar chutes to solve the third recall.

=== 2026 ===
Waymo Ojai in San Francisco in July 2026

On January 7, 2026, the official name for the robotaxi was revealed to be the Waymo Ojai, named after the California city of the same name. Waymo spokesman Chris Bonelli confirmed that the change was done because most America consumers are not familiar with the Zeekr name. The Ojai was officially put into service in February 2026, available for employees to take driverless rides in San Francisco and Los Angeles. The Ojai started serving riders in San Francisco, Phoenix, and Los Angeles in June 2026; it was made available for all riders in those 3 cities in August 2026. Waymo service in San Diego began in September 2026 with an all-Ojai fleet. Since October 2026, Waymo has begun randomly assigning Ojais to select riders in all its cities.
