= Highlands-Baywood Park, California =

Unincorporated community in California, United States

Highlands-Baywood Park
- Unincorporated community Former census designated place
- Location in San Mateo County and the state of California

- Location in the United States
- Coordinates: 37°31′30″N 122°20′36″W
- Country: United States
- State: California
- County: San Mateo

Area
  - Total: 1.807 sq mi (4.681 km^{2})
  - Land: 1.807 sq mi (4.681 km^{2})
  - Water: 0 sq mi (0 km^{2}) 0%

Population (2010)
  - Total: 4,027
  - Density: 2,228/sq mi (860.3/km^{2})
- Time zone: UTC-8 (PST)
  - Summer (DST): UTC-7 (PDT)
- ZIP code: 94402
- Area code: 650
- FIPS code: 06-33633

Highlands-Baywood Park is an unincorporated community and former census designated place (CDP) in San Mateo County, California, United States. The population was 4,027 at the 2010 census.

== Geography ==
According to the United States Census Bureau, the CDP has a total area of 1.8 square miles (4.7 km^{2}). None of it is covered by water.

== Demographics ==
Historical population
Census	Pop.	Note	%±
1990	2,644		—
2000	4,210		59.2%
2010	4,027		−4.3%
U.S. Decennial Census; 1860–1870 1880-1890; 1900 1910 1920; 1930 1940 1950; 1960 1970 1980; 1990 2000 2010; 2020

Highlands-Baywood Park first appeared as a census designated place under the name Highlands in the 1990 U.S. census. The name was changed to Highlands-Baywood Park in the 2000 U.S. census. Prior to the 2020 U.S. census, the CDP was split into the Highlands CDP and the Baywood Park CDP.

=== 2010 census ===
Highlands-Baywood Park CDP, California – Racial and ethnic composition Note: the US Census treats Hispanic/Latino as an ethnic category. This table excludes Latinos from the racial categories and assigns them to a separate category. Hispanics/Latinos may be of any race.
Race / Ethnicity (NH = Non-Hispanic)	Pop 2000	Pop 2010	% 2000	% 2010
White alone (NH)	2,832	2,405	67.27%	59.72%
Black or African American alone (NH)	55	52	1.31%	1.29%
Native American or Alaska Native alone (NH)	11	9	0.26%	0.22%
Asian alone (NH)	852	1,016	20.24%	25.23%
Pacific Islander alone (NH)	10	17	0.24%	0.42%
Some Other Race alone (NH)	10	15	0.24%	0.37%
Mixed Race or Multi-Racial (NH)	190	207	4.51%	5.14%
Hispanic or Latino (any race)	250	306	5.94%	7.60%
Total	4,210	4,027	100.00%	100.00%

=== 2010 ===
At the 2010 census Highlands-Baywood Park had a population of 4,027. The population density was 2,228.0 inhabitants per square mile (860.2/km^{2}). The racial makeup of Highlands-Baywood Park was 2,657 (66.0%) White, 53 (1.3%) African American, 9 (0.2%) Native American, 1,017 (25.3%) Asian, 17 (0.4%) Pacific Islander, 47 (1.2%) from other races, and 227 (5.6%) from two or more races. Hispanic or Latino of any race were 306 people (7.6%).

The census reported that 3,839 people (95.3% of the population) lived in households, 16 (0.4%) lived in non-institutionalized group quarters, and 172 (4.3%) were institutionalized.

There were 1,425 households: 507 (35.6%) had children under the age of 18 living in them, 974 (68.4%) were opposite-sex married couples living together, 94 (6.6%) had a female householder with no husband present, and 41 (2.9%) had a male householder with no wife present. There were 36 (2.5%) unmarried opposite-sex partnerships, and 9 (0.6%) same-sex married couples or partnerships. 254 households (17.8%) were one person and 150 (10.5%) had someone living alone who was 65 or older. The average household size was 2.69. There were 1,109 families (77.8% of households); the average family size was 3.07.

The age distribution was 1,061 people (26.3%) under the age of 18, 182 people (4.5%) aged 18 to 24, 798 people (19.8%) aged 25 to 44, 1,179 people (29.3%) aged 45 to 64, and 807 people (20.0%) who were 65 or older. The median age was 44.6 years. For every 100 females, there were 102.1 males. For every 100 females age 18 and over, there were 96.6 males.

There were 1,467 housing units at an average density of 811.6 per square mile, of the occupied units 1,255 (88.1%) were owner-occupied and 170 (11.9%) were rented. The homeowner vacancy rate was 0.5%; the rental vacancy rate was 7.6%. 3,410 people (84.7% of the population) lived in owner-occupied housing units and 429 people (10.7%) lived in rental housing units.

=== 2000 ===
At the 2000 census there were 4,210 people, 1,536 households, and 1,216 families in the CDP. The population density was 2,340.1 inhabitants per square mile (903.5/km^{2}). There were 1,548 housing units at an average density of 860.4 per square mile (332.2/km^{2}). The racial makeup of the CDP in 2010 was 59.7% non-Hispanic White, 1.3% non-Hispanic African American, 0.2% Native American, 25.2% Asian, 0.4% Pacific Islander, 0.4% from other races, and 5.1% from two or more races. Hispanic or Latino of any race were 7.6%.

Of the 1,536 households 30.3% had children under the age of 18 living with them, 69.7% were married couples living together, 6.9% had a female householder with no husband present, and 20.8% were non-families. 15.2% of households were one person and 7.4% were one person aged 65 or older. The average household size was 2.63 and the average family size was 2.92.

The age distribution was 24.3% under the age of 18, 4.7% from 18 to 24, 24.0% from 25 to 44, 30.1% from 45 to 64, and 16.8% 65 or older. The median age was 43 years. For every 100 females, there were 101.3 males. For every 100 females age 18 and over, there were 94.9 males.

The median household income was $105,165 and the median family income was $119,184. Males had a median income of $85,035 versus $57,813 for females. The per capita income for the CDP was $46,584. About 1.0% of families and 2.2% of the population were below the poverty line, including 2.7% of those under age 18 and 3.6% of those age 65 or over.

== Government ==
In the California State Legislature, Highlands-Baywood Park is in the 13th senatorial district, represented by Democrat Josh Becker, and in the 21st Assembly district, represented by Democrat Diane Papan.

In the United States House of Representatives, Highlands-Baywood Park is in California's 15th congressional district, represented by Democrat Kevin Mullin.
