= Zeekr Mix =

Battery electric minivan

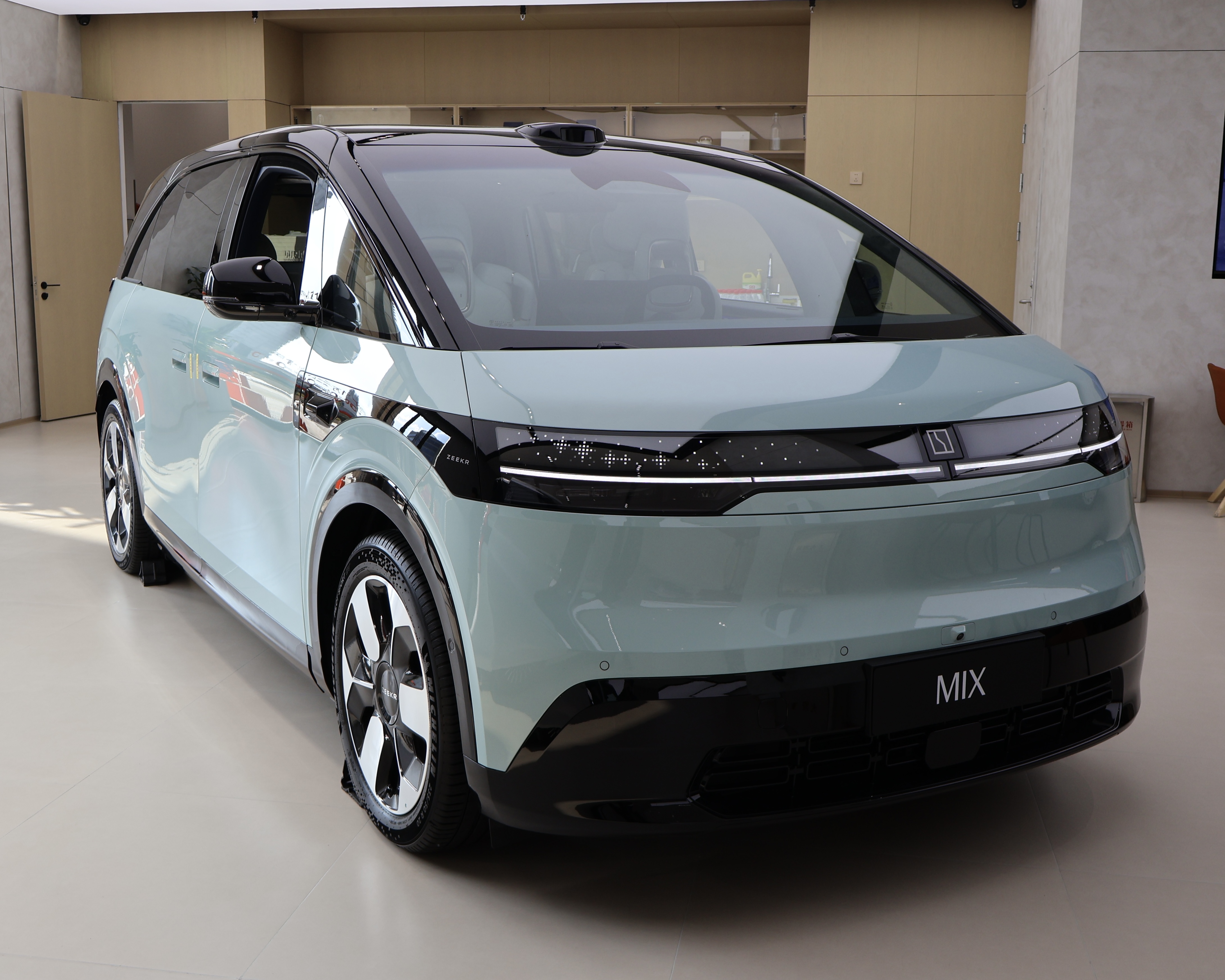

Overview
- Manufacturer: Zeekr (Geely Auto)
- Model code: CM2E
- Production: October 2024 – present
- Assembly: China: Luqiao, Zhejiang (Luqiao CMA Super Factory)
- Designer: Under the lead of Stefan Sielaff

Body and chassis
- Class: Minivan
- Body style: 5-door van
- Layout: Rear-motor, rear-wheel drive; Dual-motors, all-wheel-drive
- Platform: SEA-M
- Related: Waymo Ojai

Powertrain
- Electric motor: 310 kW TZ235XYC01 PMSM
- Power output: 200 kW (268 hp; 272 PS) (RWD); 310 kW (416 hp; 421 PS) (RWD) / (AWD)
- Transmission: Single-speed gear reduction
- Battery: 76 kWh Golden LFP Zeekr VREMT; 102 kWh Qilin NMC CATL
- Electric range: 550–712 km (342–442 mi) (CLTC)

Dimensions
- Wheelbase: 3,008 mm (118.4 in)
- Length: 4,688 mm (184.6 in)
- Width: 1,995 mm (78.5 in)
- Height: 1,755 mm (69.1 in)
- Curb weight: 2,639–2,739 kg (5,818–6,038 lb)

The Zeekr Mix (Chinese: 极氪MIX; pinyin: Jíkè MIX) is a battery electric minivan produced by Geely Automobile Holdings under the premium electric automobile brand Zeekr. Built exclusively for sale on the domestic Chinese market, the Mix immediately went on sale after its premiere to the public in April 2024 during Auto China.

== Overview ==
The Zeekr Mix was officially launched at an event in Hangzhou, Zhejiang on October 23, 2024. It is Zeekr's sixth model, placed in the range below its flagship, the 009 luxury minivan. It takes the form of a less squat and more rounded van with a one-box profile and a notably long wheelbase that is slightly over 3 metres (118 in) in length. Zeekr does not explicitly classify the vehicle as an MPV however, as they claim that it has a similar driving experience and ground clearance to a crossover SUV, while MPVs typically feature three rows and seat six or seven passengers.

The Mix shares its platform with the Waymo Ojai.

According to Zeekr, the Mix is designed to maximize cabin interior space while minimizing exterior dimensions as much as possible. Compared to a conventional mid-to-large sized SUV, it cost 2.8 times more to develop and has a much higher space utilization rate at 93% compared to below 70%. It also has unique features such as a swiveling front passenger seat, which cost three times more to engineer compared to a conventional seat.

The Mix uses a MacPherson strut in the front and has a multilink rear suspension with adaptive dampers. It is also equipped with a roof-mounted LiDAR, which allows for ADAS and autonomous driving capabilities along with mmWave radars and cameras.

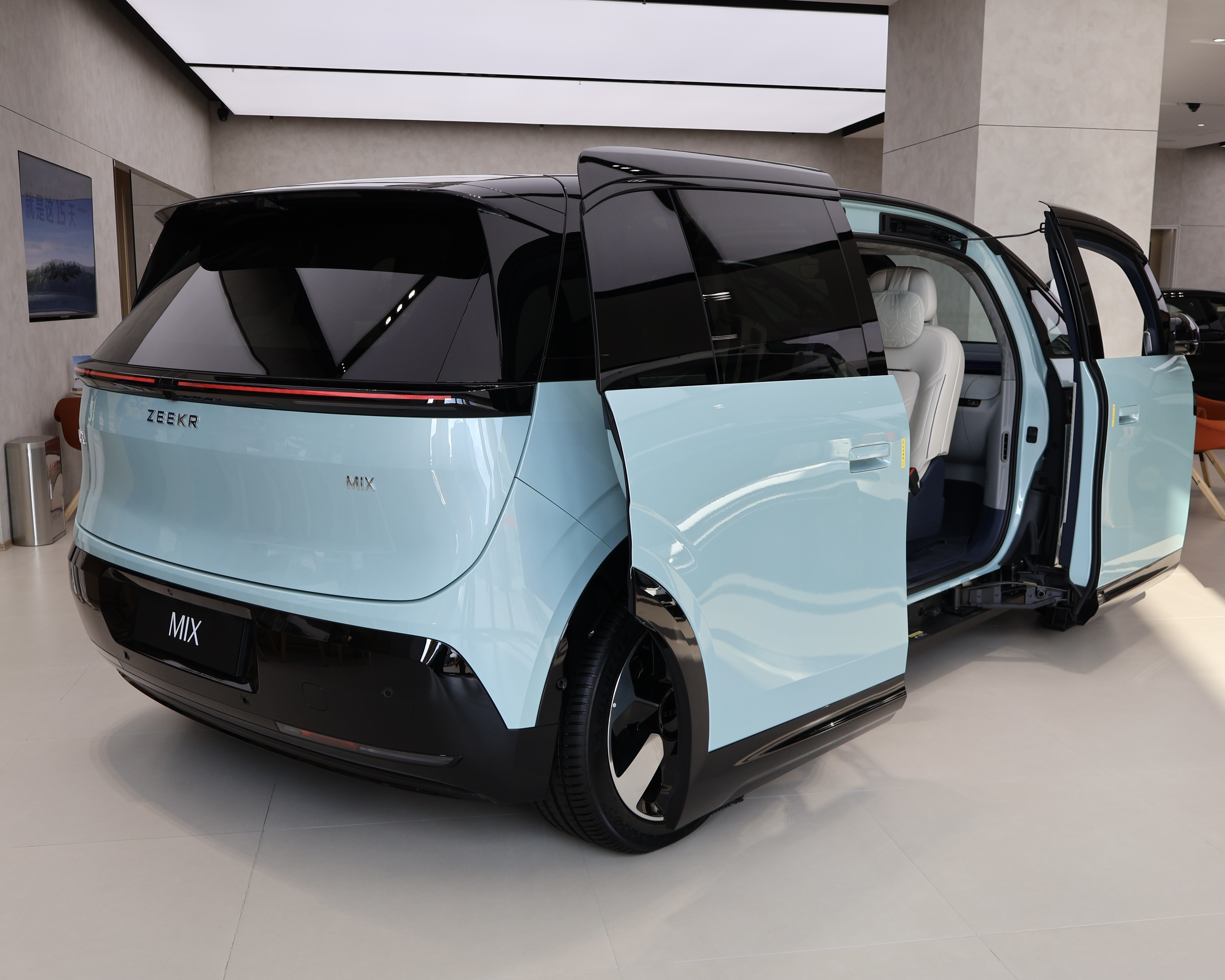
Rear view

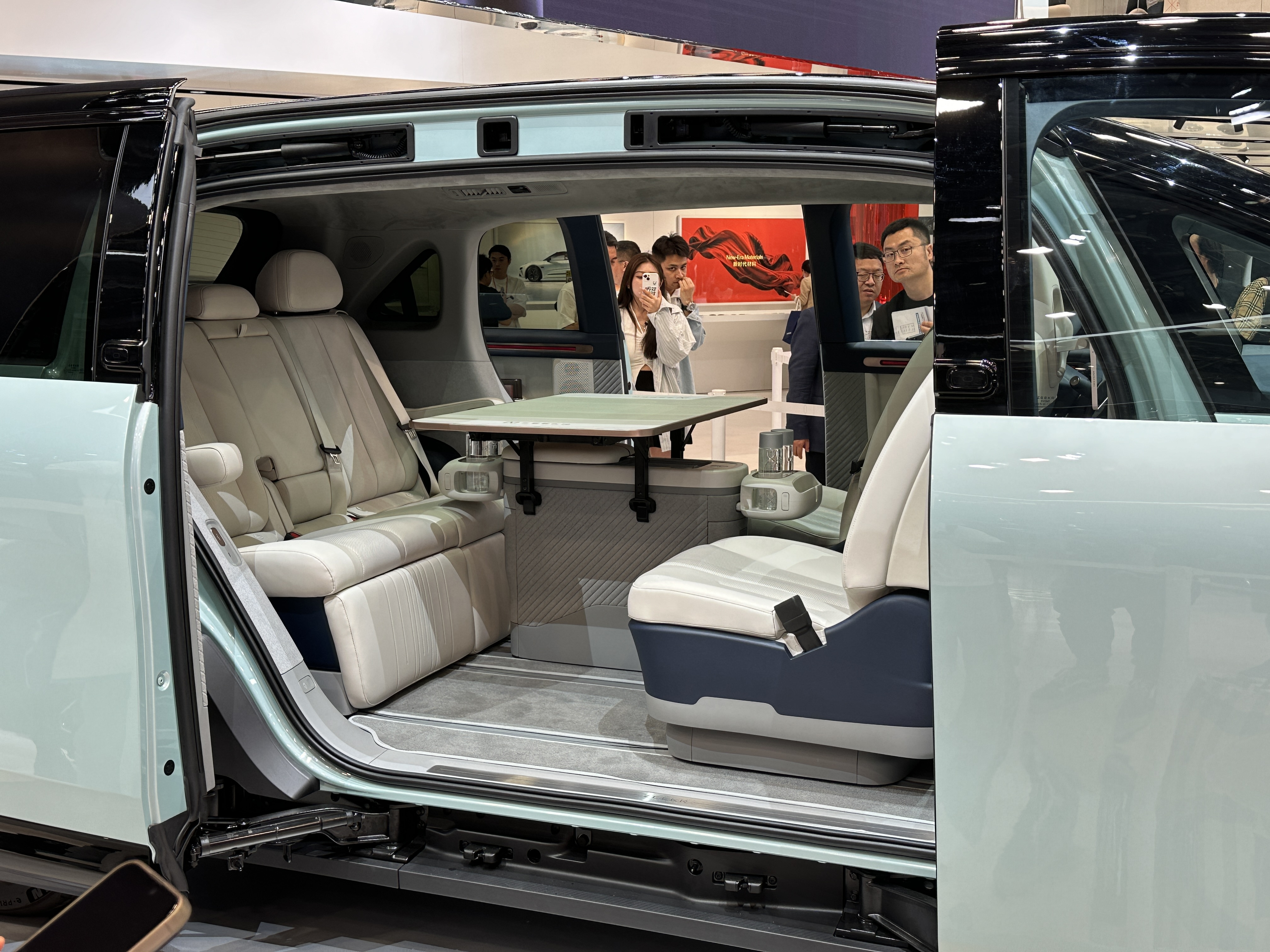
Interior

=== Exterior ===
Visually, the Mix recreates the visual features of the 007 sedan, with a characteristic large black stripe running across the entire width of the body known as the "Stargate". It continues through the wheel arches and onto the front fenders and has headlight units integrated within it. The rear tailgate is topped with a high-mounted LED light strip for its taillights.

The Mix has rearward sliding rear doors and a forward sliding front passenger door; the driver's door is a conventional front-hinged design. Both doorway entrances lack pillars obstructing entry when both front and rear doors are open, resulting in a width of 1,480 mm (58.3 in). To compensate for the pillarless design, the doors are reinforced with ultra-high strength steel to allow for sufficient side-impact crash safety. The body is painted with a contrasting black roof, which includes a sunroof. Due to the lack of front motor, the front wheels can turn over 50 degrees, allowing for a 4.95-metre (16.2 ft) turning radius.

=== Interior ===
The dashboard contains a 13.02-inch digital gauge cluster screen along with an augmented-reality heads-up display, while a manually tiltable 15.05-inch 2.5K-resolution OLED infotainment touchscreen is mounted in the center, all powered by a Snapdragon 8295P with 32GB of RAM. The Mix is equipped with a fixed panoramic sunroof and a 21-speaker audio system with Dolby Atmos.

The Mix has five seats, and the front seats can rotate 270 degrees to face either backwards, each other, or towards the door. The outer two rear seats have a power folding leg rest, and an optional folding leg rest is mounted on the back of the front passenger seat. The center console is power sliding and also contains a refrigerator compartment and integrated folding table, and has mounting points for several accessories. Every seatback can also fold down, allowing for 9 different seating configurations, including a conversation mode, fishing mode, and all seatbacks folded down allowing space for a bed for camping. Both front and rear seats are equipped with heated, ventilated and massaging functions.

The floor is 350 mm (13.8 in) off the ground, and the ceiling height is 1,350 mm (53.1 in) above the floor. The Mix has a total of 6.3 m^{2} (68 sq ft) of interior space, and the trunk has a capacity of 568 litres (20.1 cu ft). The Mix is capable of V2L, and is equipped with a 220V AC power outlet in the trunk.

=== Driver assistance ===
The Mix is equipped with the Zeekr AD ADAS system with a sensor suite consisting of one Robosense roof-mounted LiDAR, 5 mmWave radars, 12 cameras, and 12 ultrasonic sensors. It is powered by two Nvidia Orin-X chips which provide a combined 508 TOPS of computing power, and the system is capable of Level 2 supervised autonomous driving in highway and urban conditions.

== Powertrain ==
The Mix is propelled by a single powertrain option, a 310 kW (416 hp; 421 PS) motor with 800-volt power electronics driving the rear wheels with 440 N⋅m (325 lb⋅ft) of peak torque. It has a top speed of 180 km/h (112 mph) and a 0–100 km/h (62 mph) acceleration time of 6.8 seconds.

There are two battery options, a standard range and an extended range pack both using an 800V architecture. The standard Zeekr-developed 76 kWh LFP 'Golden Battery' is capable of 5.5C charging, allowing for a 10-80% charging time of 10.5 minutes, which Zeekr claims is the world's fastest. The extended range CATL designed Qilin 102 kWh NMC pack is produced by a Geely-CATL joint venture facility. On the CLTC test cycle, the standard battery achieves 550 kilometres (342 mi) of range, while the larger pack is rated for 702 kilometres (436 mi).

Specifications
Battery		Power	Torque	Range	10–80% charge	Kerb weight
Type	Weight	Power	Torque	CLTC	10–80% charge	Kerb weight
76 kWh Golden Brick LFPVREMT	605 kg (1,334 lb)	310 kW (416 hp; 421 PS)	440 N⋅m (325 lb⋅ft)	550 km (342 mi)	10.5 min	2,739 kg (6,038 lb)
102.78 kWh Qilin NMCCATL	617 kg (1,360 lb)	310 kW (416 hp; 421 PS)	440 N⋅m (325 lb⋅ft)	702 km (436 mi)	15 min	2,739 kg (6,038 lb)

== Safety ==
C-NCAP (2024) test results 2024 Zeekr Mix Long-Range Intelligent Driving
Category		%
Overall:	5 /5 stars	91.8%
Occupant protection:		94.85%
Vulnerable road users:		85.23%
Active safety:		91.67%

== Sales ==
Year	China
2024	1,633
2025	1,290
