= Highlands, California =

Highlands
- Unincorporated community Census-designated place
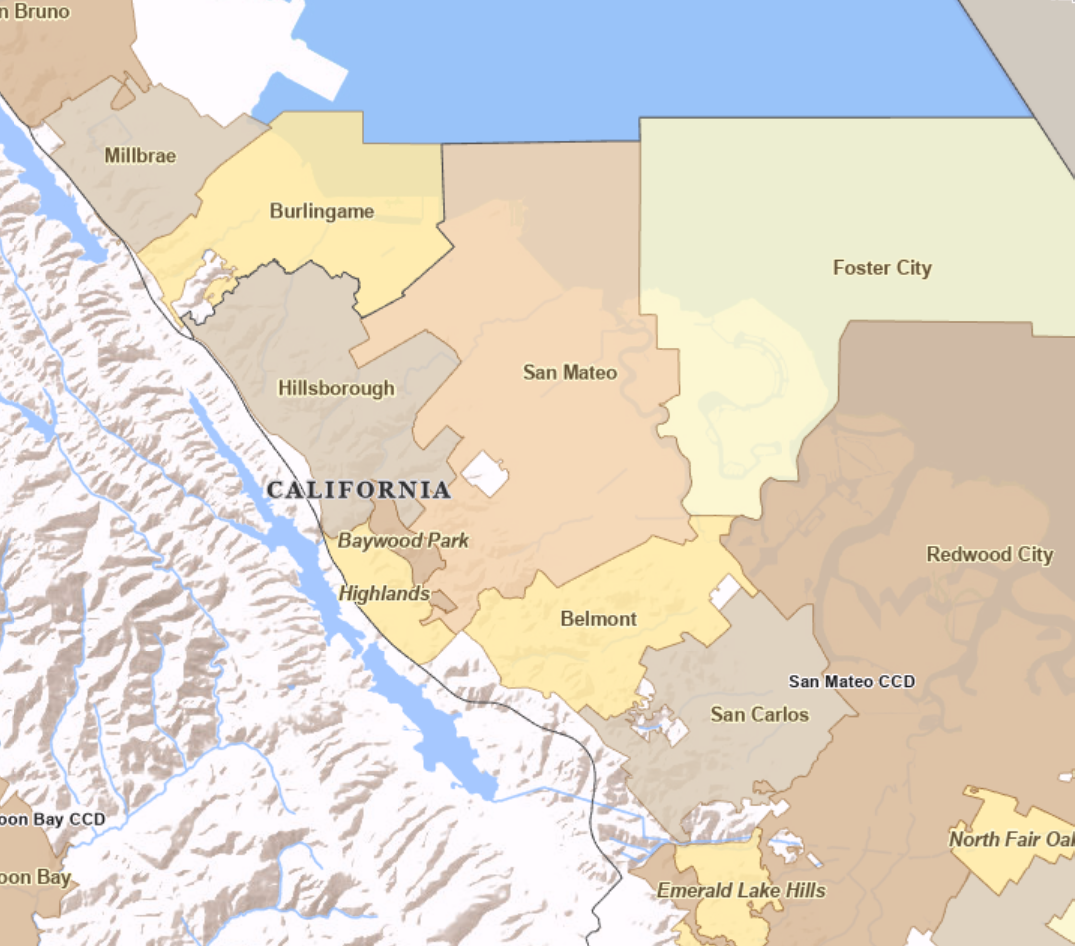
- Neighboring communities of Highlands CDP

- Location within California Location within the United States
- Coordinates: 37°31′12.08″N 122°20′45.24″W
- Country: United States
- State: California
- County: San Mateo

Area
  - Total: 1.304 sq mi (3.38 km^{2})
  - Land: 1.304 sq mi (3.38 km^{2})
  - Water: 0 sq mi (0 km^{2})
- Elevation: 554 ft (169 m)

Population (2020)
  - Total: 2,359
  - Density: 1,809/sq mi (698.5/km^{2})
- Time zone: UTC-8 (Pacific)
  - Summer (DST): UTC-7 (PDT)
- GNIS feature ID: 2805051

Highlands or San Mateo Highlands is an unincorporated community and census designated place (CDP) in San Mateo County, California, United States. As of the 2020 U.S. census, the population was 2,359.

== Geography ==
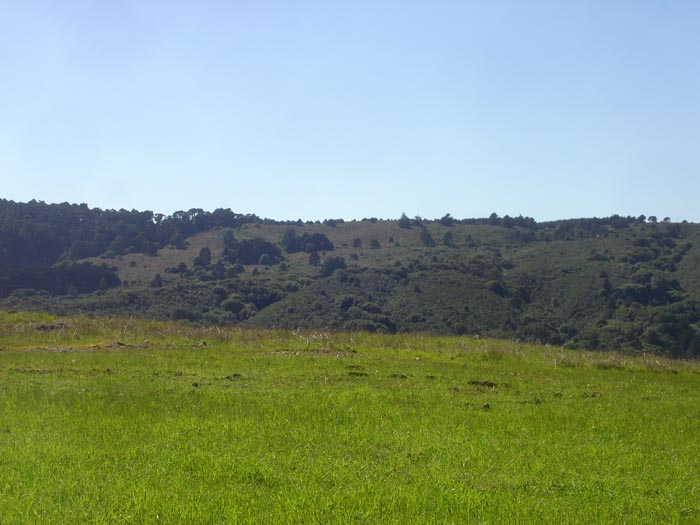
View from the Highlands

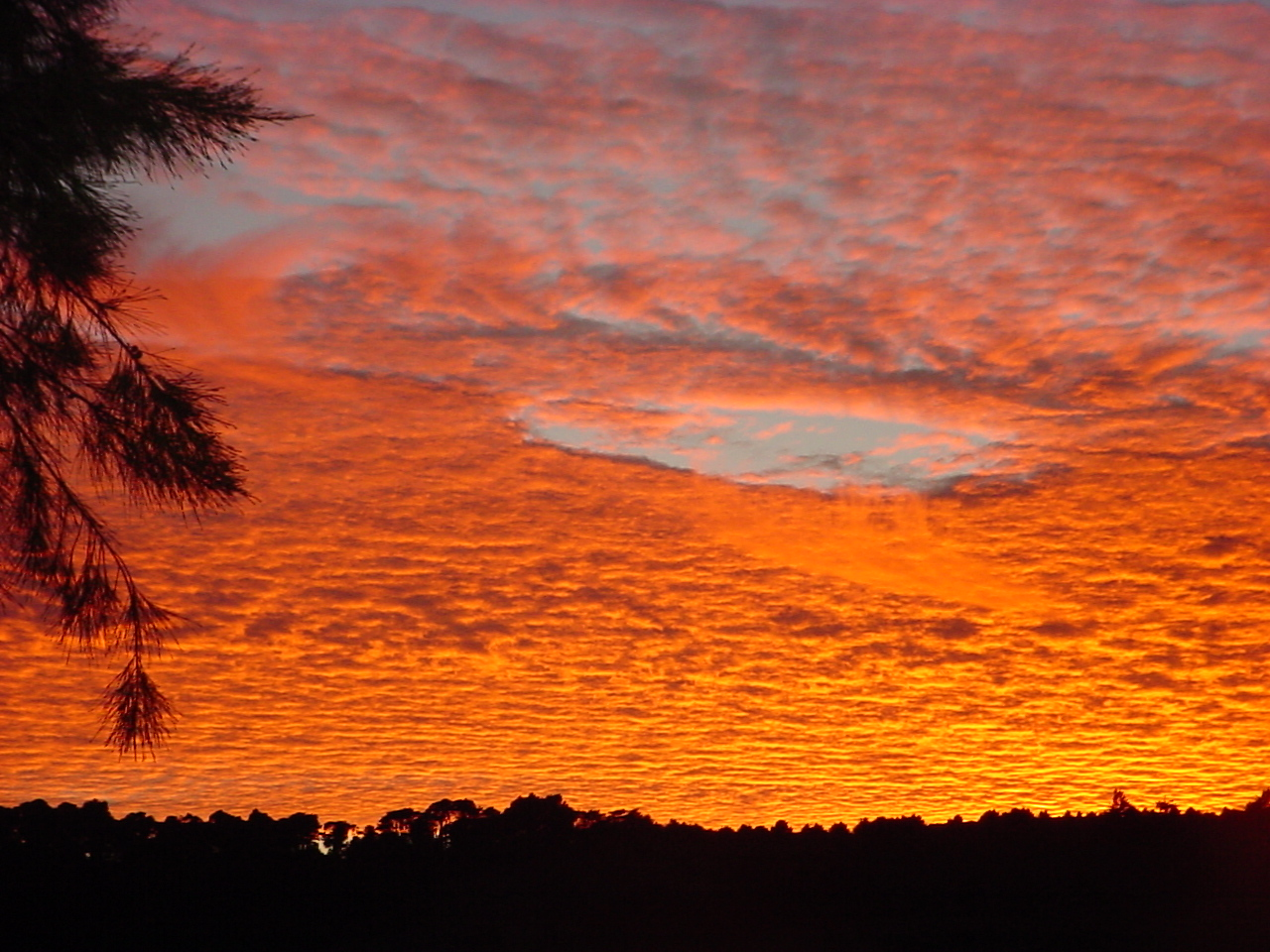
Sunset over the Highlands

It is bordered by Interstate 280 to the west, State Route 92 to the south, Polhemus Road to the east, and Crystal Springs Road, which parallels San Mateo Creek, to the north. The town of Hillsborough is just north of the Highlands, the unincorporated community of Baywood Park and the city of San Mateo are to the east, and the city of Belmont is to the southeast.

The Highlands is known for its scenic views. The Highlands sits on top of Pulgas Ridge, west of the city of San Mateo overlooking the Lower Crystal Springs Reservoir which lies just to the west and straddles the San Andreas Fault. The east side of the Highlands offers many views of San Francisco Bay, the San Mateo Bridge, and on clear days, Mount Diablo in Contra Costa County.

On three sides, the Highlands is surrounded by open space, with canyons to the north and east and a more gentle sloping hillside to the west.

== Climate ==
Due to its location on the top of a ridge, near the gap in the Santa Cruz Mountains where SR 92 transects the mountains, the Highlands receives a good deal of foggy weather as hot dry air in the Central Valley pulls cool, moist air off the Pacific Ocean. Temperatures in the Highlands are typically five to ten degrees (F) colder than cities just to the south of the SR 92 gap.

== Demographics ==
Highlands was first listed as a census designated place in the 2020 U.S. census after the Highlands-Baywood Park CDP was split into the Baywood Park and Highlands CDPs.

Historical population
Census	Pop.	Note	%±
2020	2,359		—
U.S. Decennial Census; 1850–1870 1880-1890; 1900 1910 1920; 1930 1940 1950; 1960 1970 1980; 1990 2000 2010 2020

=== 2020 census ===
As of the 2020 census, Highlands had a population of 2,359. The median age was 46.0 years. 24.3% of residents were under the age of 18 and 21.7% of residents were 65 years of age or older. For every 100 females there were 102.3 males, and for every 100 females age 18 and over there were 97.8 males age 18 and over.

100.0% of residents lived in urban areas, while 0.0% lived in rural areas.

There were 836 households in Highlands, of which 33.0% had children under the age of 18 living in them. Of all households, 70.0% were married-couple households, 10.2% were households with a male householder and no spouse or partner present, and 15.3% were households with a female householder and no spouse or partner present. About 15.8% of all households were made up of individuals and 9.3% had someone living alone who was 65 years of age or older.

There were 853 housing units, of which 2.0% were vacant. The homeowner vacancy rate was 0.0% and the rental vacancy rate was 4.2%.

Highlands CDP, California – Racial and ethnic composition Note: the US Census treats Hispanic/Latino as an ethnic category. This table excludes Latinos from the racial categories and assigns them to a separate category. Hispanics/Latinos may be of any race.
Race / Ethnicity (NH = Non-Hispanic)	Pop 2020	% 2020
White alone (NH)	1,239	52.52%
Black or African American alone (NH)	20	0.85%
Native American or Alaska Native alone (NH)	0	0.00%
Asian alone (NH)	720	30.52%
Native Hawaiian or Pacific Islander alone (NH)	10	0.42%
Other race alone (NH)	4	0.17%
Mixed race or Multiracial (NH)	217	9.20%
Hispanic or Latino (any race)	149	6.32%
Total	2,359	100.00%

== Recreation ==
The Highlands Recreation District was formed in 1957 with an elected Board of Directors. In 1958 they began construction on building the facilities, and now offer a year-round swimming pool, tennis courts, playground, community social room, and gym. The Recreation District offers children's programs from infant and toddler day care to teen cooking classes as well as adult educational and community programs.

The Highlands is also very close to Sawyer Camp Trail and many residents are able to jog or bike to the trail from their homes. The trail runs for 6 miles (10 km) along the Lower Crystal Springs Reservoir and offers scenic views, wildlife and safe paved trails for jogging, biking, walking, roller blading, and bicycling. Cañada Road, which runs parallel to I-280, is also easily reached by joggers and bicyclists from the Highlands. Cañada Road is closed to traffic on Sundays from March to October to allow safe jogging, walking, bicycling or roller blading with scenic views of Upper Crystal Springs Reservoir. The area is adjacent to Pulgas Ridge Open Space Preserve, which also includes hiking trails.

== History and architecture ==
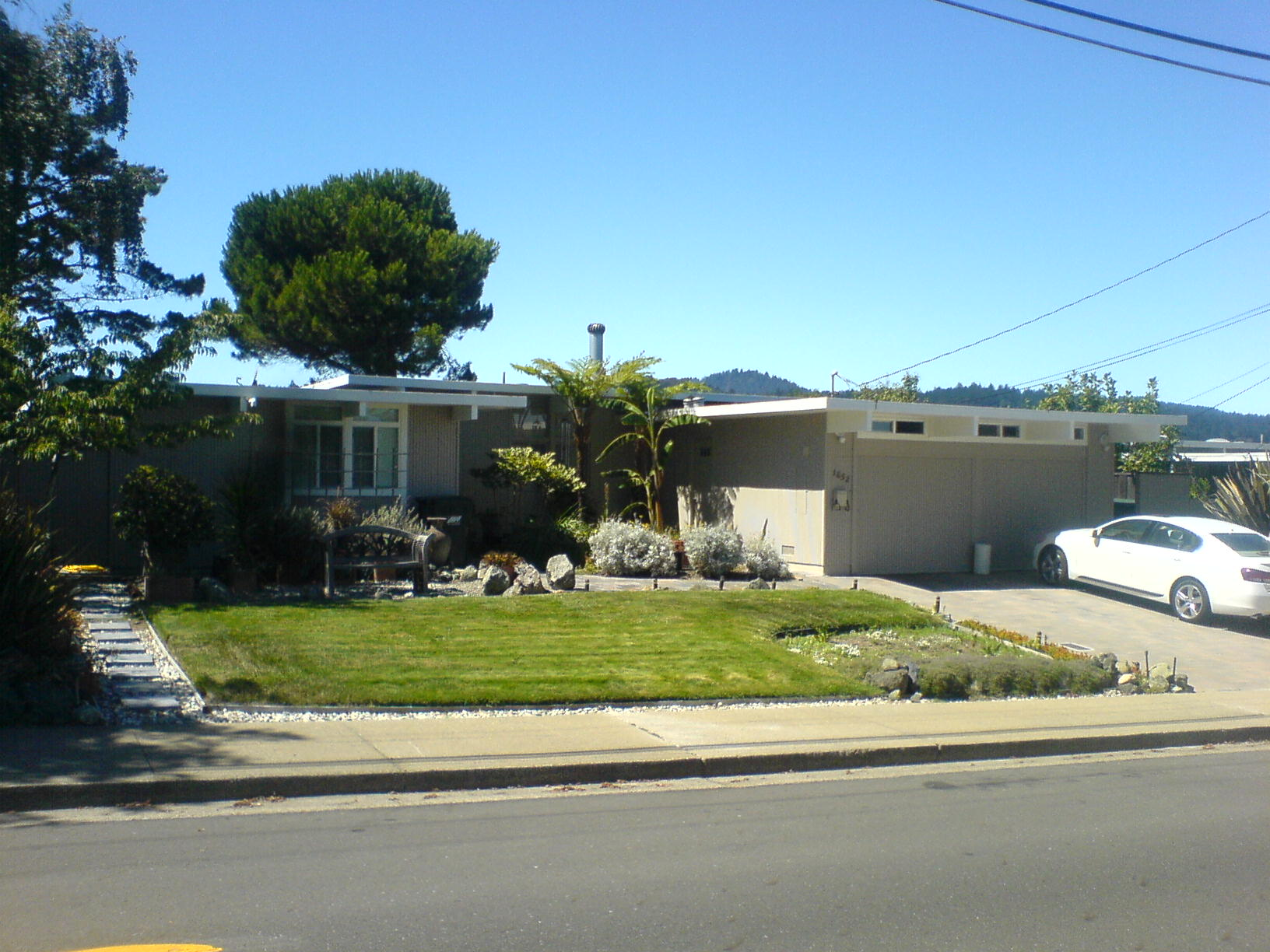
Eichler Home in the San Mateo Highlands

The Highlands was developed as a working-class neighborhood in the mid-1950s. Developer Joseph Eichler, between 1956 and 1964, built most of the homes using a Modernist style now called "California Modern", inspired by Frank Lloyd Wright. The homes are post and beam construction featuring much glass, skylights, and atria. Most have a flat or gently sloped roof and in-floor radiant heating. Many of the neighborhood homes retain their original exterior form and are sought after by enthusiasts of Modern architecture. The neighborhood also includes the experimental X-100, one of only two Eichler houses built using steel rather than timber, as well as Eichlers with additions or other modifications from their original form and homes built by other developers in more traditional styles.

Adjacent to the Highlands neighborhood is a large, undeveloped parcel of land that is zoned as a Resource Management district by San Mateo County. Highlands residents have been fighting development of this parcel for over two decades. Many residents of the Highlands feel that the open space surrounding the Highlands is one of the many charms that makes the neighborhood unique and highly valued and do not wish to see further development there. Additionally many are concerned about the safety of building on the steep hillsides that comprise the parcel. Recent recommendations by the San Mateo County Planning Commission related to development on this parcel may have much wider implications for similarly zoned parcels across the county.

In prior years there has also been vigorous debate in the Highlands about changing the zoning laws to restrict development or alteration of original Eichler homes to a single story. Authority over zoning in the Highlands is held by the San Mateo County Board of Supervisors. Current zoning allows for homes up to 36 ft. high (up to three stories). The original single-story Eichlers are 9 to 11 ft. high while two-story homes in the neighborhood by other developers reach up to 23 feet in height. The neighborhood includes over 700 single-story Eichler homes, a handful of original two-story Eichler homes built up against steep hillsides, and 55 later 2nd story additions (remodels).

== Community ==
The Highlands Community Association is a volunteer-run community association. It is not a homeowners association and, as such, does not have authority to set laws or policies in the neighborhood. Membership in the Highlands Community Association requires a nominal fee. The Association publishes a monthly newsletter, the Highlands Lowdown, which has been in continuous publication since 1954.

The Association also sponsors an annual 4th of July festival, begun and continuously run since 1960. The 4th of July festival includes a parade and fireworks display on the evening of July 3rd. The fireworks display is intended for the Highlands community only, not outside guests. Following the parade on the morning of July 4th are other activities including a water carnival with swim races, arcade games, food, a foot race and other activities.

The United Methodist Church in the Highlands offers community discussions, day care services and has an active theater group known as the Crystal Springs Players.
