= Baywood Park, San Mateo County, California =

Baywood Park
- Unincorporated community Census-designated place
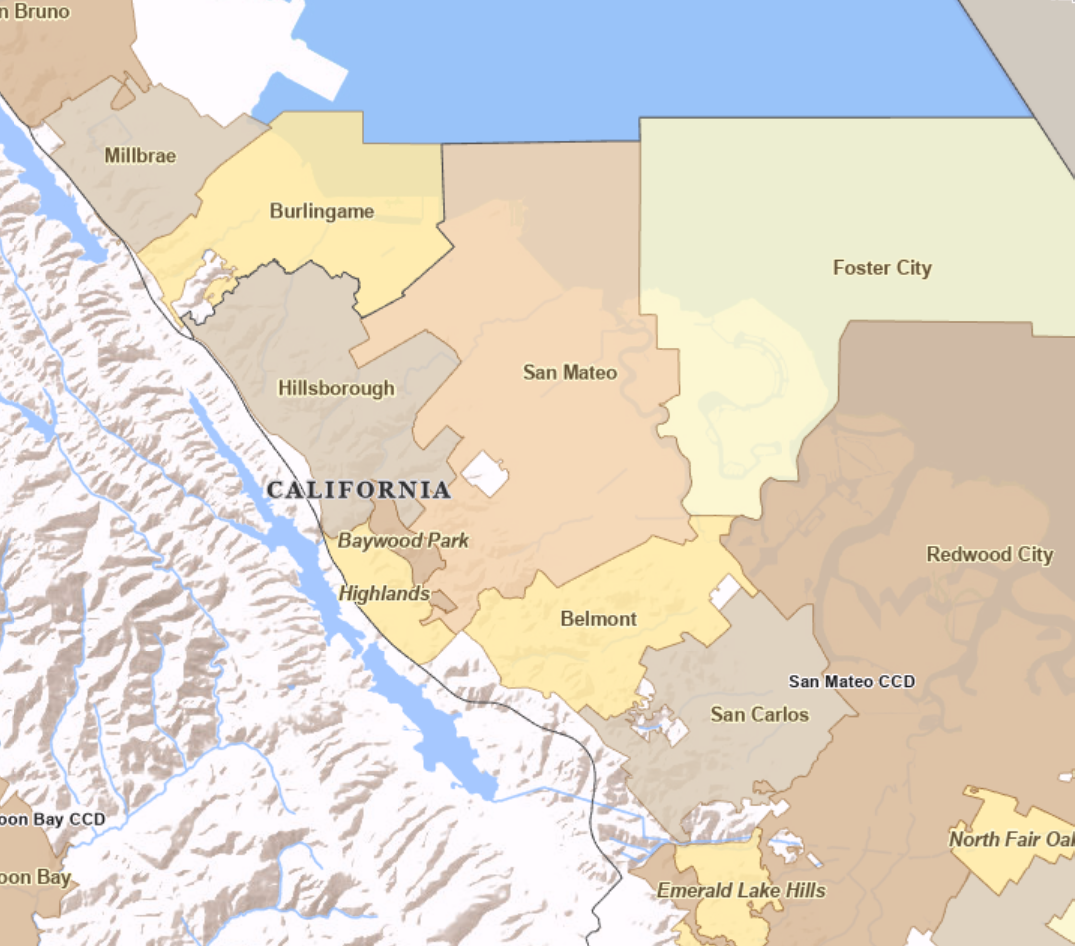
- Neighboring communities to Baywood Park

- Location within California Location within the United States
- Coordinates: 37°31′44.99″N 122°20′29.90″W
- Country: United States
- State: California
- County: San Mateo
- Elevation: 528 ft (161 m)

Population (2020)
  - Total: 1,693
- Time zone: UTC-8 (Pacific)
  - Summer (DST): UTC-7 (PDT)
- GNIS feature ID: 2804108

Baywood Park is an unincorporated community and census designated place (CDP) in San Mateo County, California, United States. As of the 2020 U.S. census, the population was 1,693.

== Demographics ==
Baywood Park was first listed as a census designated place in the 2020 U.S. census after the Highlands-Baywood Park CDP was split into the Baywood Park and Highlands CDPs.

Historical population
Census	Pop.	Note	%±
2020	1,693		—
U.S. Decennial Census; 1860–1870 1880-1890; 1900 1910 1920; 1930 1940 1950; 1960 1970 1980; 1990 2000 2010; 2020

=== 2020 census ===
Baywood Park CDP, California – Racial and ethnic composition Note: the US Census treats Hispanic/Latino as an ethnic category. This table excludes Latinos from the racial categories and assigns them to a separate category. Hispanics/Latinos may be of any race.
Race / Ethnicity (NH = Non-Hispanic)	Pop 2020	% 2020
White alone (NH)	848	50.09%
Black or African American alone (NH)	11	0.65%
Native American or Alaska Native alone (NH)	0	0.00%
Asian alone (NH)	626	36.98%
Native Hawaiian or Pacific Islander alone (NH)	5	0.30%
Other race alone (NH)	6	0.35%
Mixed race or Multiracial (NH)	101	5.97%
Hispanic or Latino (any race)	96	5.67%
Total	1,693	100.00%
