= List of self-driving system suppliers =

This is a list of self-driving car system (SDS) suppliers and self-driving truck system (SDS) suppliers.

== Definitions ==
Light vehicles (LV) include passenger cars, whereas heavy vehicles (HV) include trucks and buses.

Driverless operation means operating vehicles without a human safety driver, that is SAE Level 4 or 5.

Operational design domain (ODD) is the operating conditions in which the SDS can operate, which may be limited in the environment or traffic characteristics. A restricted ODD is limited by design to specific areas or industries, for example highway driving only, or private-ground operation in mine sites or ports.

== Light vehicles ==
Name	Vehicle partners	Country	Launch city	Date of first public road driverless operation
Argo AI	Ford and Volkswagen Group	USA	Munich	2021
Aurora	Toyota	USA	TBA	n/a
Auto X	SAIC Motor	China	Shenzhen	January 2021
Baidu	FAW Group	China	Beijing	May 2021
Cruise	General Motors and Honda	USA	San Francisco	December 2020
EasyMile	n/a	France	Bad Birnbach	October 2019
May Mobility	Toyota	USA	Detroit	June 2018
Mobileye	Volkswagen Group	USA / Germany	Jerusalem	January 2020
Motional	Hyundai Motor Group	USA	Las Vegas	Feb 2021
Nuro	Lucid	USA	Mountain View	July 2025
Pony.ai	Toyota	USA	Beijing	April 2022
Waymo	Chrysler and Jaguar Cars	USA	Phoenix, Arizona	November 2017
Wayve	Nissan	UK	London	April 2019
WeRide	Renault–Nissan–Mitsubishi Alliance	China	Beijing	November 2023
Woven Planet Holdings	Toyota	Japan	TBA	n/a
Avride	Hyundai	Russia	Innopolis, Tatarstan	August 2018
Zoox	n/a	USA	Las Vegas	September 2025

== Heavy vehicles ==
Name	ODD	Vehicle partners	Country	Launch location	Date of first driverless operation
ASI	Restricted (mining)	Liebherr	USA	TBA	n/a
Aurora	n/a	Paccar and Volvo	USA	TBA	n/a
Einride	n/a	n/a	Sweden	TBA	n/a
Gatik.ai	n/a	Isuzu	Canada	Arkansas	August, 2021
kodiak.ai	n/a	n/a	USA	TBA	n/a
Plus.ai	n/a	Iveco	USA	TBA	n/a
torc.ai	n/a	Caterpillar and Mercedes-Benz Group	USA	TBA	n/a
TuSimple	n/a	Traton	USA	Arizona	December, 2019
Waymo	n/a	Mercedes-Benz Group	USA	TBA	n/a
