= Self-driving truck =

Type of autonomous vehicle

A self-driving truck, also known as an autonomous truck or robo-truck, is an application of self-driving technology aiming to create trucks that can operate without human input. Alongside light, medium, and heavy-duty trucks, many companies are developing self-driving technology in semi trucks to automate highway driving in the delivery process.

In September 2022, Guidehouse Insights listed Waymo, Aurora, TuSimple, Gatik, Plus, Kodiak, Daimler Truck, Einride, Locomation, and Embark Trucks (acquired by Applied Intuition) as the top 10 vendors in automated trucking. And, Transport Topics in November 2022 is listing fourteen companies to know about self-driving truck; Aurora, Waymo, TuSimple, Gatik, Locomation, Torc Robotics, Waabi, Einride, Plus, Embark, Kodiak, Robotic Research, Outrider and Pronto. In February 2024, this list was updated to reflect the exit of Waymo, TuSimple, Embark, and Locomation, as well as the addition of Stack AV.

Since 2022, daily testing occurs with human safety drivers behind the wheel, often performing commercial pilots for customers. Only in limited validation runs on test tracks have these autonomous trucking companies performed driverless operations where no human is located in the vehicle anymore. The reason is a self-imposed high acceptance bar for safe deployment of this technology.

In December 2024, Kodiak became the first company to launch commercial driverless operations of autonomous trucks in the United States. Operating on private lease roads in West Texas, the company provides a driver-as-a-service solution on customer-owned heavy-duty trucks. Self-driving trucks are expected to be deployed more widely on highways in the United States by 2027.

Several government agencies in the U.S. and Europe have announced new legislation surrounding the use of autonomous trucks. Some challenges of bringing self-driving trucks on public roads include, but are not limited to, road safety, the need for human drivers inside the vehicle, and the lack of specific regulations surrounding driverless vehicles.

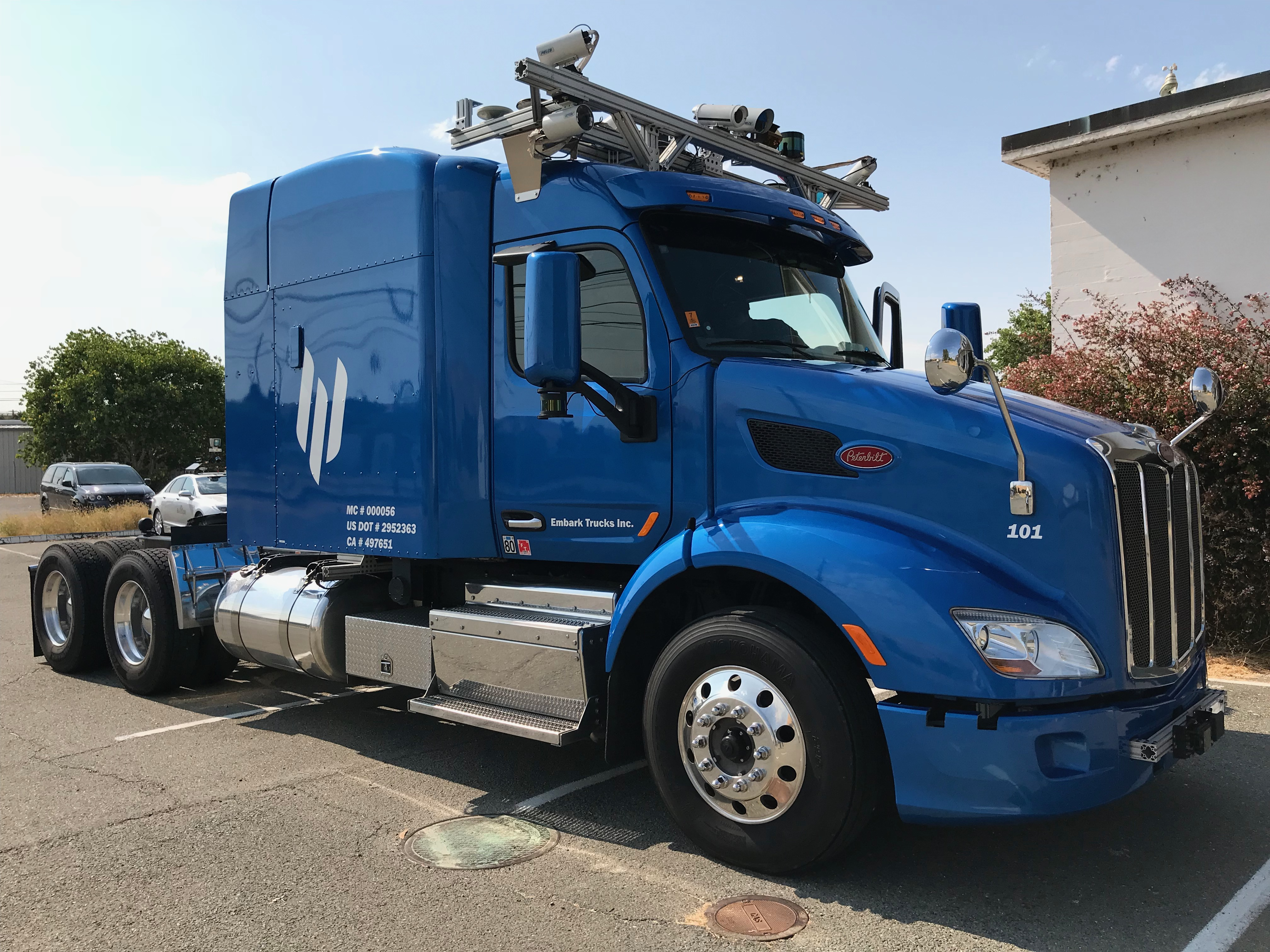
Embark Trucks autonomous semi cab on display

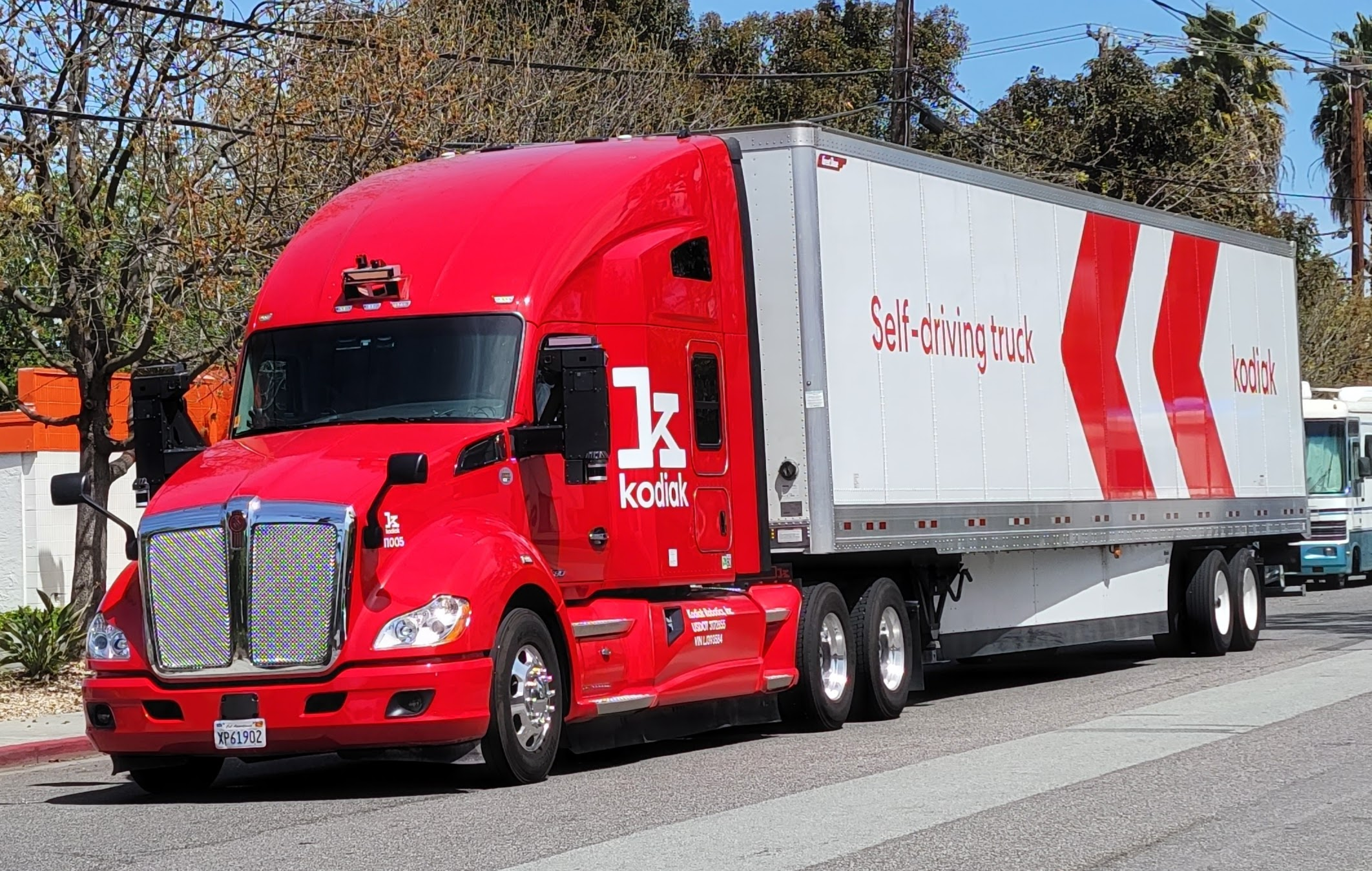
Kodiak self-driving truck (Kenworth T680) on the street

== History ==
=== 1990s ===
As recorded in June 1995 in Popular Science Magazine, self-driving trucks were being developed for combat convoys, whereby only the lead truck would be driven by a human and the following trucks would rely on satellite navigation, an inertial guidance system and ground-speed sensors.

=== 2000s ===
Komatsu made the earliest development in autonomous trucks testing a fleet of five Ultra Class trucks in Codelco Mine Radomiro Tomic in Chile in 2005 then in 2007 was installed the first working fleet in the mine Gabriela Mistral in Chile, also a Codelco property.

=== 2010s ===
Lockheed Martin, with funding from the U.S. Army, developed an autonomous truck convoy system that uses a lead truck operated by a human driver with a number of trucks following autonomously. Developed as part of the Army's Autonomous Mobility Applique System (AMAS), the system consists of an autonomous driving package that, as of 2014, has been installed on more than nine types of vehicles and has completed more than 55,000 hours of driving at speeds up to 64 km/h (40 mph). As of 2017, the Army was planning to field 100–200 trucks as part of a rapid-fielding program.

In Europe, truck platooning was being considered with the Safe Road Trains for the Environment approach, a project that ended in September 2012.

Since May 2015, Daimler has been testing self-driving trucks on public roads in Nevada, USA. In the USA, self-driving vehicles (such as the Inspiration Truck) are already permitted under certain conditions.

=== 2020s ===
MAN develops autonomous trucks. In test runs at Hamburg's CTA terminal in 2021, a truck drove autonomously across the terminal, navigated in mixed traffic, and parked with precise reverse maneuvering. Outside the terminal, control was handled by a driver.

In 2026, after launching in 2025, Aurora trucks became able to drive nonstop from Phoenix to Fort Worth, a roughly 1,000 mile, 15 hour trip. At the time Its autonomous fleet numbered 5 trucks operating between Dallas/Ft Worth, El Paso, and Houston.

== Terminology ==
=== US truck classification ===
Self-driving trucks are being developed for all classes of trucks including, light duty, medium duty.

==== Light-duty trucks ====
The EPA defines a light-duty truck to be any truck with a maximum payload capacity of 4,000 pounds and weight of 8,500 pounds (in the US only). In Europe, a light-duty truck is classified as a truck with a maximum weight of 7,720 pounds.

The U.S. Census Bureau defines a light-duty truck to have a maximum weight of 10,000 pounds.

Examples of light-duty trucks include pickup trucks, SUVs, and vans. The 2023 Ford F-150 is an example of a light-duty truck with the new Ford BlueCruise 1.2 Technology.

==== Medium-duty trucks ====
The U.S. Census Bureau, unlike the EPA, established a third classification for medium duty trucks. A medium-duty truck is classified as a truck with a weight range of 10,000 to 26,000 pounds.

Examples of medium-duty trucks include box trucks and school buses. The UK government recently awarded €81 million for the production of self-driving technology in public buses.

==== Heavy-duty trucks ====
The EPA defines a heavy-duty truck to have a minimum weight of 8500 pounds (in the US). The US Census Bureau defines a heavy-duty truck with a minimum weight of 26,000 pounds.

Examples of heavy-duty trucks include cement mixers, mobile cranes, and semi trucks.

=== SAE levels of self driving ===
SAE International (formerly the Society of Automotive Engineers) defines six levels of driving automation ranging from "No Driving Automation" at Level 0 to "Full Driving Automation" at Level 5. This classification system is based on the degree of driver intervention required for driving. Levels 0, 1, and 2 focus on driver support features, such as adaptive cruise control and highway lane centering, while Levels 3, 4, and 5 focus on completely autonomous features, such as manual steering, control in traffic, and driving "everywhere in all conditions".

Self-driving truck technology shares similar characteristics to self-driving car technology, but additional complexity such as the weight added in the process of carrying freight contribute to some differences. There are currently light-duty trucks on the market, such as Ford's BlueCruise, that contain SAE Level 2 features, but companies like Torc are moving toward Level 4 and 5 features.

Partially automated truck platooning systems contain at least SAE Level 1 features and provide economic and environmental benefits.

== Technology ==
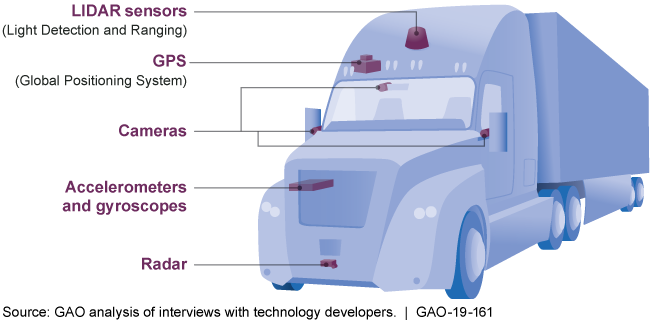
Example of how a multi-sensor system in a self-driving truck may function

=== Sensors ===
Sensors, such as Lidar, radar, cameras, ultrasonic, and GPS, are crucial to self-driving technology. Due to different sensors performing best at different functions required for autonomous driving and the financial and technological challenges associated with relying on only one sensor, a successful self-driving truck system will likely feature many.

Multi-sensor solutions, such as one manufactured by Continental integrate many pre-calibrated sensors that work synchronously to achieve self-driving features SAE Level 4 and above in modern trucks.

=== Mapping and localization ===
High-resolution mapping technology, often combined with real-time sensor data, can build and update a detailed map that provides better access to vehicle localization information.

=== Artificial intelligence ===
Machine learning is a subset of artificial intelligence that is well-suited to self-driving truck technology as machine learning algorithms allow the vehicle to learn from its environment and past experiences and make attempts to improve its ability to make more accurate and informed decisions about how to operate on the road. Self-driving truck companies like Plus are developing predictive analytic systems to predict potential hazards and risks a truck may encounter and take proactive measures to avoid accidents or other safety issues.

Sensors that measure speed, distance, and distance in combination with a detailed map and an accurate sense of the vehicle's sense of location within that map often provide the input for artificial intelligence systems built to interpret the context.

AI also monitors distance, weather conditions, freight density, truck stop and warehouse density, and autonomous vehicle legislation to generate truck routes.

Humans are thought to be better than modern artificial intelligence systems at interpreting contextual information when put against modern autonomous vehicle systems, but self-driving artificial intelligence systems are expected to improve exponentially in the next decade.

=== Navigation and control systems ===
The software and hardware components govern a truck's steering, acceleration, braking, and other critical functions, such as obstacle avoidance and collision detection. Similar to self-driving cars, self-driving trucks may use a combination of GPS, inertial measurement units (IMUs), and other sensors to determine their position and orientation on the road such that it can adjust its movements, turn, make stops, gain directional cues, and make decisions on how to operate.

== Economics and advancements ==
=== Market ===
The trucking industry in the United States annually generates around $740 billion in revenue. In 2021, there was approximately 2.1 million truck drivers in the United States; American truck drivers earn a median annual salary of $48,310.

According to Allied Market Research, the global self-driving truck market may have generated as much as $1 billion in revenue in 2020, and is projected to reach the market size of about $1.7 billion by 2025, growing at a compound annual growth rate of 10.4 percent from 2020 to 2025.

=== Employment ===
The deployment of autonomous trucks is projected to fundamentally restructure the United States logistics workforce, primarily impacting the 2.1 million truck drivers. According to the UC Berkeley Labor Center, approximately 294,000 long-distance drivers are at the highest risk of displacement, as the industry shifts toward a "transfer hub" model. In this framework, autonomous systems handle the long distance highway segments while human drivers perform the short distance drives through urban environments. While this could potentially create 26,400 to 35,100 new technical and local logistics roles annually by 2026, research suggests these new positions may not offer the same earnings or benefits associated with traditional long-haul careers.

The geographic and demographic distribution of these impacts is notably uneven, with the "Sun Belt" states—Texas, Florida, and Arizona—serving as the primary corridors for early adoption due to favorable weather and legislative environments. Workforce demographics play a critical role in the pace of displacement. Data indicates the trucking industry faces consistently faces an aging workforce with high retirement rates, which leads to more "natural attrition" than mass layoffs. As a result, a shortage of 160,000 truck drivers is expected by 2030. If the adoption of Level 4 autonomous systems remains gradual through this timeframe, the technology may function more as a solution to chronic driver shortages rather than a direct competitor to existing workers.

Current policy discussions in 2026 emphasize the necessity of "high-road" labor standards to ensure that productivity gains from automation are shared with the workforce. The UC Berkeley Labor Center argues that without proactive intervention, the transition could exacerbate wealth inequality by shifting profits toward large carriers while degrading job quality for the remaining human operators. Emerging roles in Remote Operations Centers - offices where drivers can remotely pilot trucks - and autonomous maintenance offer potential pathways for displaced drivers, but these require significant reskilling initiatives - which research shows a high percentage of drivers are unwilling to undergo.

=== External Economic Impacts ===
The economic impact of autonomous trucking extends beyond the logistics sector, threatening the stability of roadside economies that depend on driver spending. In the United States, nearly half of all truck vehicle-miles-traveled occur on rural roads, where small-town economies are frequently anchored by truck stops, diners, and motels. Because autonomous trucks do not require mandated rest periods or meal breaks, the widespread adoption of Level 4 technology is projected to significantly reduce consumer demand at these service points. This shift places approximately $200 billion in existing economic activity supported by the sector at risk, particularly in rural corridors where there are few alternative sources of commercial revenue.

The demographics of those affected by these secondary economic shifts are distinct from the driving workforce. While truck drivers are overwhelmingly male and older, with a median age of 46, the service workers in truck stops and roadside motels are often more diverse, representing higher proportions of women and entry-level workers. These service roles typically do not require advanced education, but they provide critical income in rural areas where the cost of living is low. Consequently, the "spatial mismatch" created by automation—where high-tech maintenance jobs are created in urban hubs while service jobs vanish along rural interstates—could exacerbate regional wealth inequality and lead to a decline in the socioeconomic viability of traditional "truck stop towns".

The integration of autonomous trucking is projected to generate $9 billion in annual consumer savings by 2035, driven by a 45% reduction in total industry operating costs. These gains originate from a 32% improvement in fuel efficiency, yielding $5.7 billion in annual fuel savings, and a $1.4 billion reduction in insurance overhead due to enhanced safety. By doubling equipment utilization to over 1,000 miles per day, autonomous systems allow for "always-on" 24/7 delivery cycles that stabilize the landed cost for U.S. consumer products moved by truck. With a forecast of 170,000 self-driving trucks representing 15% of the total market by 2035, the technology is expected to add a net $6 billion to the broader U.S. GDP while providing households with increased purchasing power for food, retail, and industrial goods.

=== Companies ===
Company name	Advancements
Waymo	In 2017, Waymo started to test their autonomous technology in trucks by delivering to Google's Atlanta data centers. In March 2020, Waymo announced the official launch of Waymo Via, which includes the use of autonomous Class 8 trucks for delivery. As of November 2021, UPS has partnered with Waymo to test a system of transferring packages between sorting hubs without the need of a driver.
Tesla	Tesla released the CyberTruck in the 2023 model year, which is a pickup truck that has the option of being equipped with full self-driving (SAE Level 2) for an additional $7000.
Kodiak	In March 2018, Kodiak AI (formerly Kodiak Robotics) announced they had hired employees from Uber after they shut down their autonomous truck efforts. In December 2022, Kodiak won the contract with the Defense Innovation Unit (DIU) to prototype autonomous software that can navigate complex, off-road terrain, diverse operational conditions and GPS-challenged environments. DIU is leveraging this partnership to build a pipeline between the commercial and military deployment of self-driving vehicle technologies that will reduce the risk to troops in war zones. In December 2024, Kodiak became the first company to launch commercial driverless operations of autonomous trucks in the United States. Operating on private lease roads in West Texas, the company provides a driver-as-a-service solution on customer-owned heavy-duty trucks.
TuSimple	TuSimple is creating technology for self-driving semi-trucks and has been running daily routes in Arizona. In May 2019, TuSimple announced a contract for a two-week pilot delivering mail for the United States Postal Service with plans to run five round trips between Dallas, Texas and Phoenix, Arizona, with two humans on board. In March 2020, TuSimple expanded its freight-hauling pilot program with the United Parcel Service (UPS) to run 20 trips per week hauling cargo between Phoenix and Tucson, Arizona, and between Phoenix and El Paso, Texas. In December 2021, TuSimple completed its first autonomous truck run on open public roads without a person on board, by driving 80 miles between a railyard in Tucson, Arizona and a distribution center in Phoenix. In October 2022, TuSimple's CEO, Chief Technology Officer, and co-founder, Xiaodi Hou, was fired by the company's board, which cited a "loss in trust and confidence" in Hou's judgment in connection with an alleged sharing of confidential information with a Chinese company, Hydron Inc. The FBI, the SEC, and CFIUS are investigating TuSimple on suspicions of illicit technology transfer to Hydron in China.
Gatik	In 2021, Gatik worked with Walmart and Loblaw to test its driverless short-haul box trucks in Arkansas and Ontario, Canada. In 2023, Gatik is planning on integrating its autonomous box trucks to Pitney Bowes's ecommerce logistics network in Dallas.
Plus	In December 2019, Plus conducted the industry's first cross-country commercial freight run using a self-driving truck, carrying 40,000 pounds (18,000 kg) of butter for a distance of 2,800 miles (4,500 km) from Tulare, California to Quakertown, Pennsylvania for Land O'Lakes.
Aurora	In July 2020, Aurora opened an office in Texas to expand testing of self-driving trucks with commercial routes in the Dallas-Fort Worth area. As of 2022, Aurora has plans to launch their commercial self-driving truck operation in 2024. In May 2024, Aurora Innovation and Volvo Trucks North America unveiled the Volvo VNL Autonomous, a Class 8 truck equipped with Aurora Driver for commercial freight operations, at ACT Expo.
Einride	In June 2022, Einride received approval to operate its trucks on U.S. roads.
Locomation	In July 2020, Locomation completed a two-week pilot in collaboration with Wilson Logistics where Locomation trucks hauled commercial cargo between Portland, Oregon and Nampa, Idaho over Interstate 84.
Embark Trucks	In 2017, Embark partnered with truck manufacturer Peterbilt to test and deploy autonomous technology in Peterbilt's vehicles. In November 2018, Embark Trucks announced a pilot with national truck fleet Ryder and Frigidaire to deliver refrigerators via autonomous trucks from El Paso, Texas to Palm Springs, California. During this pilot, manually-driven Ryder trucks provided first and last mile delivery while Embark autonomous trucks carried the load as far as 306 miles (492 km) at a time on Interstate 10.
Torc Robotics	In March 2019, Daimler AG (renamed to Mercedes-Benz Group in 2022) through its subsidiary Daimler Truck North America announced that it would acquire a majority stake in Torc Robotics for an undisclosed amount as part of its automated truck program. In September 2020, Daimler Trucks and Torc Robotics opened a test center in Albuquerque, New Mexico, testing automated vehicle runs on New Mexico highways. In 2022, Torc Robotics opened an engineering office in Austin, Texas, and a Technology and Development Center in Stuttgart, Germany. The company also announced that Penske Truck Leasing would serve as the truck maintenance service provider for Torc's autonomous test fleet.
Waabi	In June 2021, Waabi raised $83.5 million in Series A funding to develop OEM integration for autonomous trucks so that manufacturers can implement self-driving technology without interrupting the assemlbly lines in the factories.
Robotic Research	In 2021 Robotic Research's commercial arm, RR.AI, raised $228 million to continue development on its Level 4 self-driving system which can be applied to Class 8 trucks and yard trucks. In the past, Robotic Research has partnered with the U.S. Army and Navy to create autonomous trucks that are able to work in areas that are not on maps, are not on GPS, and do not have road lining.
Outrider	In 2023, Outrider raised $73 million in Series C funding which it plans on using to transition from testing its autonomous electric yard trucks to commercial operations.
Pronto	In 2022, Pronto announced it partnered with Bell Trucks America to equip Pronto's Level 4 self-driving technology to haul and dump trucks.
Volvo	In 2018, Volvo announced its semi-truck concept, the Vera, which is an all electric autonomous truck with no driver cabin. In 2024, Volvo Trucks North America and Aurora Innovation announced the Class 8 Volvo VNL Autonomous at ACT Expo.
Ford	In September 2018, Ford unveiled a self-driving heavy-duty truck as the F-Vision semi concept, a SAE Level 4 autonomous vehicle.
GMC	In 2023, the GMC pickup trucks Sierra 1500 Denali and Denali Ultimate come equipped with Super Cruise, which is GMC's hands-free assistance program which is able to achieve SAE Level 2.
Ike	In March 2018, Ike announced it hired employees from Uber after Uber shut down their autonomous truck efforts.
Honda	In 2021, Honda released information that it was testing an autonomous work vehicle which is a self driving truck targeted for large worksites.
Caterpillar Inc. and Carnegie Mellon University	In 2013, Caterpillar Inc. and Carnegie Mellon Robotics made developments to improve efficiency and reduce cost at various mining and construction sites.
Uber	In August 2016, Uber acquired Otto, a company that had already demonstrated its self-driving trucks on the highway. In 2016, Uber partnered with Anheuser-Busch and made the first commercial delivery of beer over 120 miles (190 km) using a self-driving truck, with a human in the truck, but not behind the wheel. In July 2018, Uber announced it was shuttering the truck-focused branch of its autonomous vehicles program as part of a reorganization of its Advanced Technologies Group following the fatal Uber autonomous passenger vehicle crash in Tempe, Arizona in March 2018.
Starsky Robotics	In February 2018, Starsky Robotics completed a 7-mile (11-km) driverless trip in Florida without a human in the truck, though one was available to take over by remote control. Starsky Robotics claimed to be the first self-driving truck company to drive on a public road without a person in the cab.

== Safety and regulations ==
=== Safety ===
The integration of autonomous trucks (ATs) addresses the critical issue of road safety by targeting human error, which is a contributing factor in roughly 94% of all motor vehicle crashes. According to 2024 data, 5,340 people were killed in incidents involving large trucks—a figure that has seen a nearly 40% increase over the last decade. Autonomous systems are designed to eliminate the most common "human failures," such as distracted driving, fatigue, and impairment. Unlike human drivers, who suffer from exhaustion after several hours of driving, autonomous "drivers" can operate without cognitive decline, theoretically preventing the estimated 10% of crashes caused specifically by driver incapacitation.

Beyond simply replacing human operators, ATs utilize a suite of sensors that provide 360-degree situational awareness and faster reaction times than a human brain. In real-world simulations of 29 fatal crashes on I-45 in Texas, researchers found that autonomous technology would have avoided the collision in every single case. Autonomous trucks could eventually avert approximately 600,000 fatalities over a 35-year span if they operate at a safety level just 10% higher than the average human driver.

=== Regulations ===
In the United States, individual states, such as Nevada, have addressed the regulation of self-driving vehicles (including self-driving trucks) since the 2010s. By 2017, 33 states had promulgated regulations for self-driving vehicles. The National Highway Traffic Safety Administration (NHTSA) issued new federal guidelines in response to the Self Drive Act concerning Automated Driving Systems (ADS) in autonomous cars and trucks. Components of the 2019 NHTSA guidelines include:

- SAE international levels of automation;
- Clarification on testing regulation before public ADS operation;
- Revisions to the safety self-assessment;
- Alignment of federal and state guidelines;
- Clarification on federal and state jurisdiction concerning ADS.

The NHTSA guidelines were revised in 2016 with a primary focus on lowering the number of fatalities from vehicular accidents.

The State of California announced new legislation requiring a human driver to be inside and present on all self-driving vehicles. Besides safety, the motivation for this bill stems from a concern for the trucking workforce. The trucking workforce accounts for 6% of the total U.S. workforce.

In 2022, the European Union worked to develop legislation to legalize the operation of fully self-driving trucks and buses (SAE Level 4). Part of this legislation includes eliminating the requirement for a human driver inside the vehicle.

Germany is the first country in the world to create legal parameters for fully automated cars and trucks in 2021 and 2022.

== Challenges ==
A challenge of self-driving vehicles is identifying liability in collisions, as no driver is present. Furthermore, a challenge with self-driving trucks lies in the regulations and laws surrounding vehicles, such as those that are triggered by a collision. In the U.S., a driver in a crash with a semi-truck may sue the driver and the company to which the driver belongs but not the truck manufacturer. This poses a challenge regarding autonomous trucks as the primary stakeholders, the manufacturers, would not be legally responsible for any collisions. Additionally, the rise of self-driving vehicles may create a need for designated lanes and parking areas, as many roads and cities are not designed for autonomous vehicles.

This expands to the main challenge of the community's safety with autonomous vehicles. A main challenge for autonomous vehicles is the shift from needing a safety driver inside the vehicle. Many car manufacturers are pushing for the shift away from safety drivers to fully deliver on the impact of autonomous vehicles. Until manufacturers can go without safety drivers in the vehicle, there exists a challenge in the premise of autonomous vehicles.

Finally, autonomous vehicles are not currently designed to handle sudden changes in traffic, such as a freeway closure or live collision. While autonomous vehicles can currently switch lanes and enter merging traffic, they are not designed to interpret sudden traffic situations.
