= Argo AI =

Autonomous driving technology company

Argo AI LLC
- Type: Joint venture
- Industry: Self-driving car
- Founded: 2016; 10 years ago
- Founders: Bryan Salesky; Peter Rander
- Defunct: 2022
- Headquarters: Pittsburgh, Pennsylvania, U.S.
- Key people: Bryan Salesky (CEO); Peter Rander (president)
- Owner: Ford Motor Company (42%); Volkswagen Group (42%); Lyft (2.5%)
- Number of employees: 1,700
- Website: https://web.archive.org/web/20230323005047/https://www.argo.ai/

Argo AI LLC was an autonomous driving technology company headquartered in Pittsburgh, Pennsylvania. The company was co-founded in 2016 by Bryan Salesky and Peter Rander, previously part of the Google and Uber automated driving programs. Argo AI was an independent company that built software, hardware, maps, and cloud-support infrastructure to power self-driving vehicles. The company was mostly backed by Ford Motor Co. (2017) and the Volkswagen Group (2020). At its peak, the company was valued at $7 billion.

In October 2022 it was announced by Ford that the Argo would be disbanded and some employees would be split between VW and Ford. Argo's technology was further developed in-house by Ford and VW. Ford stated their intent to change the focus of development from Level 4 autonomous driving to Level 3 and Level 2+. In a statement to the press, Ford CEO Jim Farley said, "profitable, fully autonomous vehicles at scale are a long way off."

== History ==
=== Founding ===
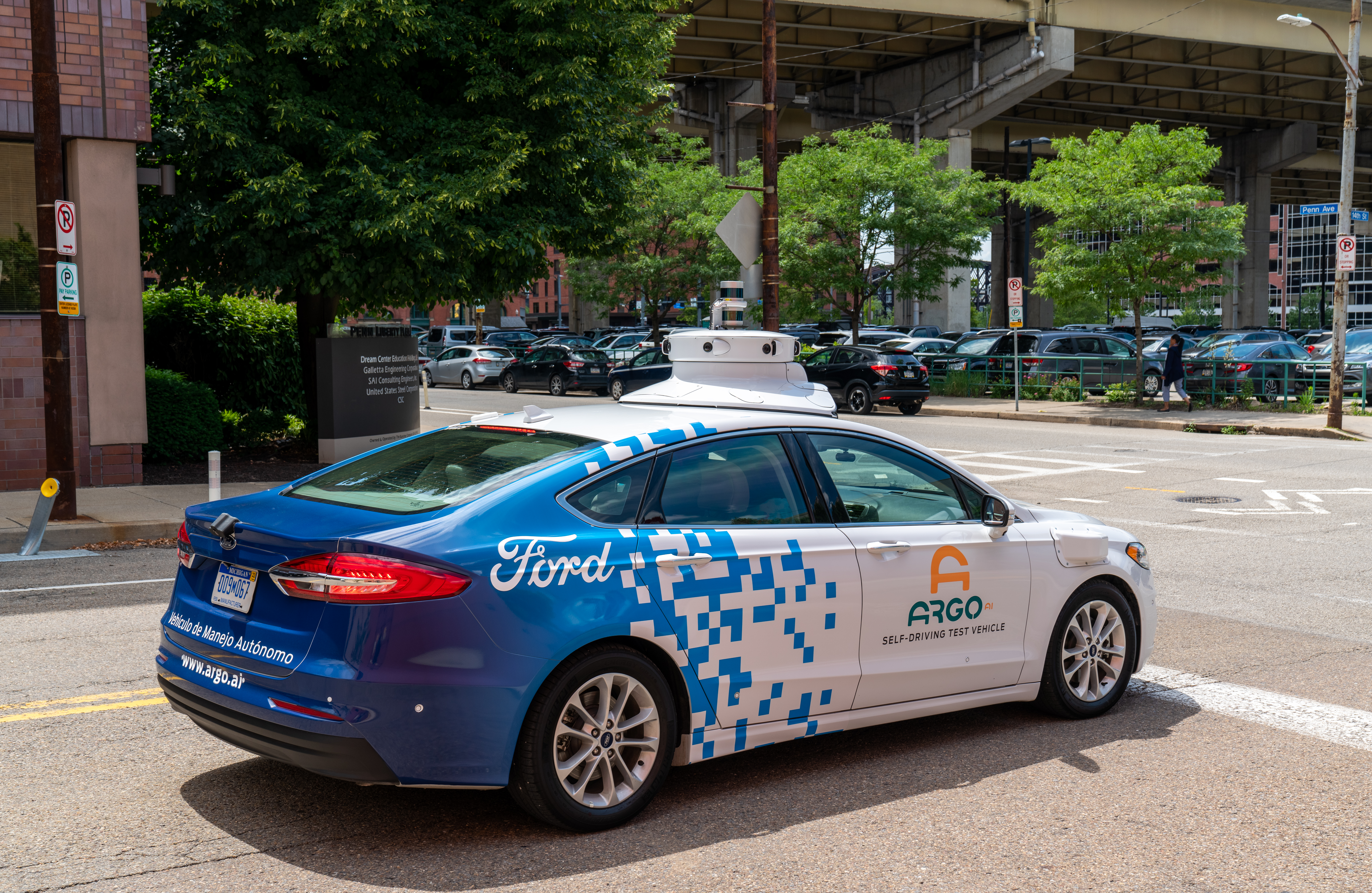
Argo AI Ford Fusion in Pittsburgh in 2019

Argo AI was co-founded in November 2016 by roboticists Bryan Salesky, CEO of the company, and company president Peter Rander. As of July 2020, the company employed over 1000 employees with offices in Pittsburgh, Detroit, Palo Alto, Cranbury, NJ and Munich, Germany. In June 2020, Argo was valued at $7.25 billion.

Salesky was born in Woodhaven, MI outside of Detroit and settled in Pittsburgh, Pennsylvania, where Argo is based. He earned a Bachelor of Science in Engineering from the University of Pittsburgh in 2002 and began working at Union Switch & Signal, a supplier of railroad signaling equipment, where he worked on anti-collision software for trains. From 2004 to 2011 he worked at the National Robotics Engineering Center (NREC) at Carnegie Mellon Robotics Academy, where Rander was his boss.

In 2007, Salesky and Chris Urmson led Carnegie Mellon’s software development team for the third DARPA driverless car competition dubbed the Urban Challenge. From 2013 - 2016, Salesky served as director of hardware development for Google’s autonomous vehicle initiative, now known as Waymo.

Rander, a Michigan native and University of Detroit Mercy alumnus earned his MS and Ph.D. degrees in Robotics at Carnegie Mellon University (CMU) and worked alongside Salesky at the National Robotics Engineering Center. From 2015 to 2016, Rander was the engineering lead for Uber’s Advanced Technology Group (ATG); Uber's self-driving car unit.

Argo AI was initially funded in late 2016 through a small seed round from an undisclosed source. In February 2017, Ford Motor Company announced that it was to invest $1 billion in Argo AI over the next five years, to develop a virtual driver system for the automaker's autonomous vehicle coming in 2021. Ford became the company's largest shareholder, enabling them to hire 200 additional employees including members of Ford's R&D team.

=== Volkswagen investments and disbandment ===
In June 2020, Volkswagen invested $2.6 billion into Argo AI. Under the terms of the deal, Volkswagen committed $1 billion in cash to Argo AI and its Munich-based Autonomous Intelligent Driving (AID) unit - valued at $1.6 billion. The AID technology unit, consisting of over 200 employees, was first launched to develop autonomous vehicle technology for VW automobiles. According to the terms of the deal, VW was to purchase Argo AI shares from Ford for $500 million over three years, while Ford would invest the remaining $600 million of its $1 billion cash commitment to the company. In executing the agreement, the Munich-based AID team was integrated into Argo AI to form the company's European engineering center.

Between the partnerships, Argo raised over $3.6 billion. Argo's ownership was shared among its largest shareholders, Ford and Volkswagen, each of whom owned 42 percent of the company. In 2017, its board of directors was composed of two Ford seats, two Volkswagen seats, and three Argo seats.

In July 2021, Lyft invested in Argo with a plan to launch services on Lyft's ride-hailing network in Austin and Miami. The partnership with Lyft boosted Argo's valuation to $12.4 billion.

In March 2022, Argo AI announced the opening of a new engineering and development office in Los Angeles.

In October 2022, after failing to secure further investment from Amazon, Ford announced that the company would be disbanded after posting an $827 million net-loss for the third quarter. Ford assumed a $2.7 billion accounting charge and wrote off a cash investment of about $500 million for Argo AI. Similarly, Volkswagen expensed €1.9 billion

A number of resources from Argo AI were transitioned to Ford's ADAS effort Latitude AI, and VW's ADAS efforts CARIAD. VW also continued it autonomy efforts with its ID BUZZ platform with Mobileye, an alternative SDS supplier.

== Technology ==
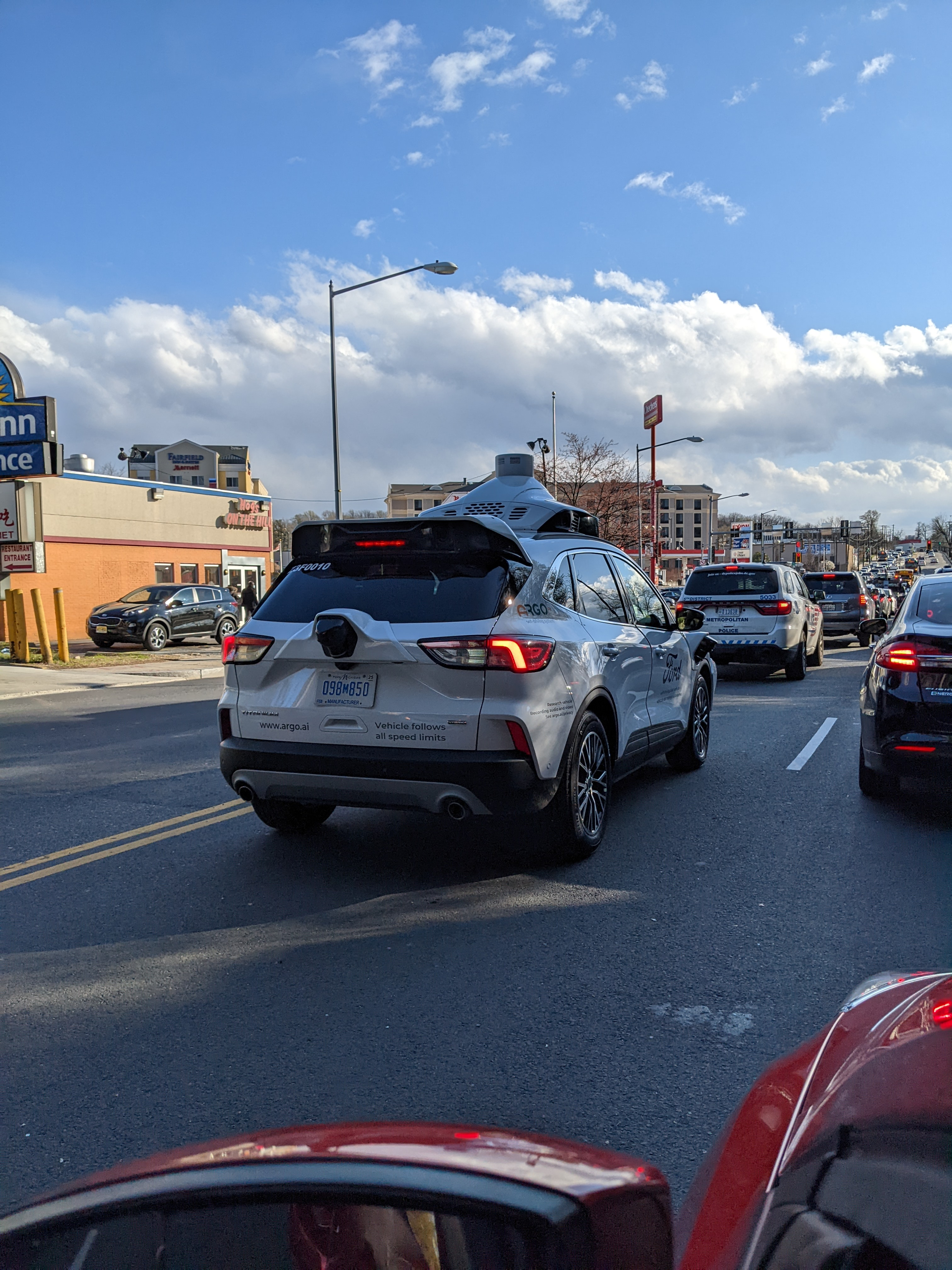
A Ford Escape with Argo AI hardware

Argo claimed its technology would deliver Level 4-capable Self-Driving Systems (SDS) for autonomous driving (AV) vehicles. Autonomous driving categories are defined by the Society of Automotive Engineers and have been adopted as industry standards by the U.S. Department of Transportation.

The technology developed by Argo comprises the entire self-driving system, including the software and hardware computing platforms, sensors, cameras, radar, and light detection and ranging radar (LIDAR). In October 2017, Argo purchased Princeton Lightwave, a producer of lidar technology, based in Cranbury, New Jersey. In 2019, Argo introduced its third-generation test vehicle, based on the Ford Fusion Hybrid, which incorporates higher-resolution cameras with wider dynamic ranges, increased computer processing power, and heating and cooling systems improvements.

Argo planned to deliver autonomous driving technology for shared fleets rather than personal ownership with applications including ride-hailing and goods delivery services. In September 2021, Argo partnered Walmart and Ford, offering a multi-city service which will allow American Walmart customers to have their online gorcery orders delivered via autonomous vehicles. Argo's cloud-based system will integrate with Walmart's online ordering platform, while Ford's self-driving driving test vehicles fitted with Argo's self-driving system will then deliver the orders to customers.

== Road testing ==
Argo has self-driving vehicle testing locations in Pittsburgh and Dearborn, Michigan as part of its research and development initiatives. In early 2018, Argo began testing vehicles in Miami, Florida marking the first time vehicles were tested outside the company's home territories of Detroit and Pittsburgh. Additional test sites for the Argo and Ford collaboration included Washington, D.C., and Austin, Texas. Argo began testing out of its Palo Alto engineering center after receiving its permit from the California Department of Motor Vehicles in January 2019. The expansion to additional urban test sites allowed the company to study the unique driving behavior and road culture of each city. Argo's testing included millions of simulations to represent various weather, infrastructure, pedestrian, and other conditions.

By 2021 Argo AI was testing the VW IDBUZZ on public roads in Munich. In May 2022, Argo AI started testing on public roads in Austin and Miami using a modified Ford Escape Hybrid.

== University research ==
In 2017, Argo announced university partnerships with Carnegie Mellon University and the Georgia Institute of Technology to research computer vision and machine learning technologies.

In June 2019, Argo announced a $15 million investment over five years to create the Carnegie Mellon University Argo AI Center for Autonomous Vehicle Research, which would have focused on advanced algorithms for autonomous vehicles, specifically for advanced perception and decision-making capabilities. The announcement follows the company's introduction of its open source data set, a set of highly curated maps and data released to further the study of autonomous vehicle research and development. As of 2020, research topics slated for study at the research center included smart sensor fusion, 3D scene understanding, urban simulation, map-based perception, behavior prediction, and software validation.

== See also ==
Aurora Innovation
