= Stadtpilot =

Research project on autonomous driving

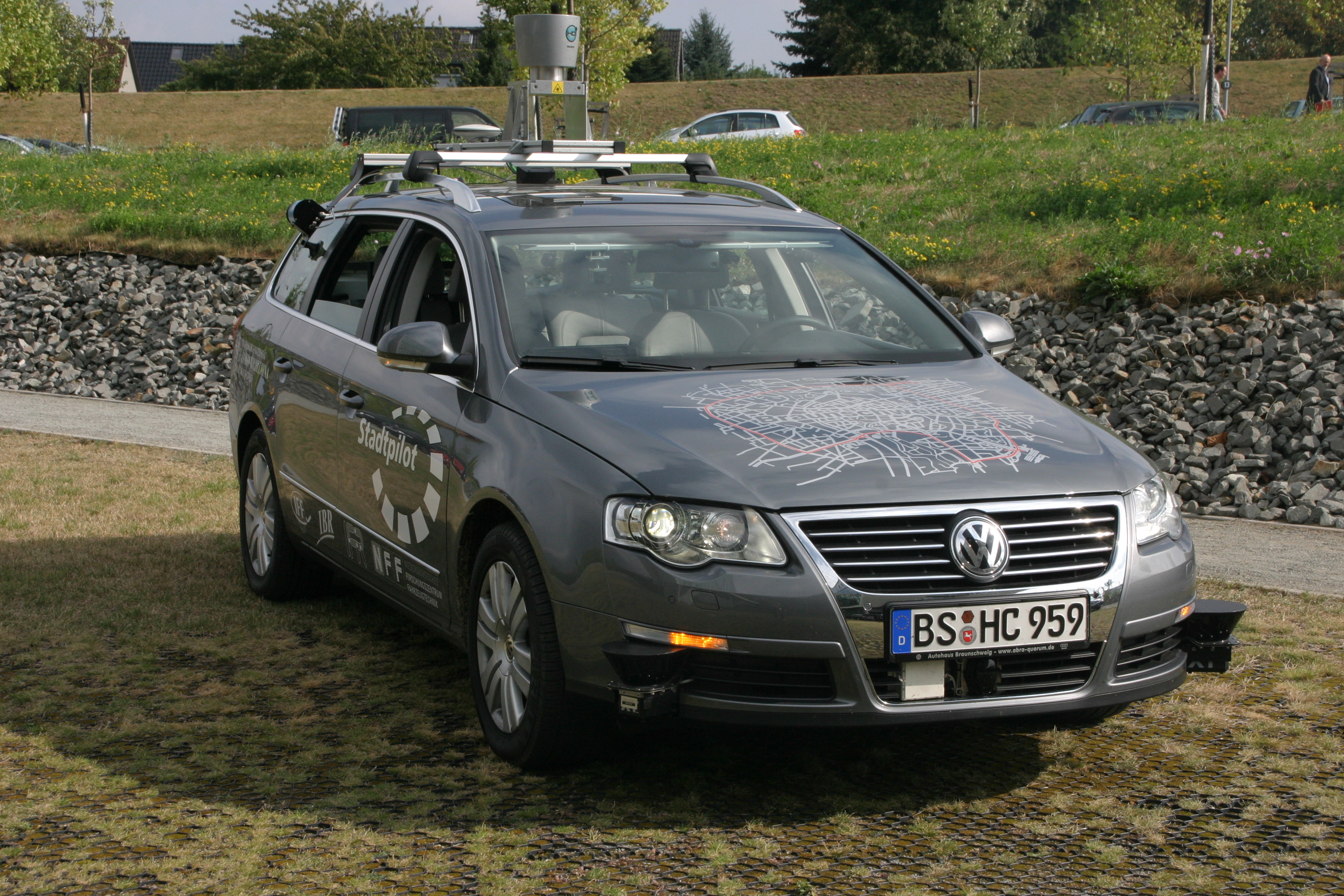
Leonie, the autonomous vehicle of project Stadtpilot

Stadtpilot is a project of the Braunschweig University of Technology, Germany. Following the qualification for the DARPA Grand Challenge (2007) with the project CarOLO, this project aims to send the cars Henry and Leonie on a course through the Braunschweig inner city (Stadtring).

On October 8, 2010, Leonie was sent on the Stadtring course in real urban traffic; reportedly being the first in the world to do so.
