= Andreas Renschler =

German engineering manager (born 1958)

- Born: Andreas Hermann Renschler; March 29, 1958 (age 68); Stuttgart, Germany
- Education: University of Tübingen
- Occupations: Business executive, engineer
- Known for: Senior executive at Volkswagen Group

Andreas Hermann Renschler (born 29 March 1958, in Stuttgart) is a German engineering manager. He is the former Chief Executive Officer of TRATON SE and member of the Board of Management of Volkswagen AG. Furthermore he is chairman of the Latin America Committee of German Business.

He was previously a member of the Daimler AG Board of Management from 1 October 2004 until 29 January 2014.

== Career ==
After completing his training as a banker, Renschler studied business engineering from 1979 to 1984 at the Technical College in Esslingen, where he obtained a Diplom degree in Business Engineering. From 1984 to 1987 he studied business administration at the University of Tübingen, where he also earned a Diplom degree. He wrote his thesis at the Hewlett-Packard computer company.

=== Daimler AG ===
In 1988 Renschler joined Daimler-Benz AG, where he initially worked in the Organization and Data Processing department. In 1989 he worked on the staff of Mercedes-Benz Chairman Werner Niefer, after which he managed project teams at the Corporate Planning unit. In 1992 he was Executive Assistant to the designated Board of Management Chairman Helmut Werner. In 1993 he was appointed to manage the All Activity Vehicle (AAV) project, whose aim was to develop an all-new luxury SUV and to select and build a corresponding production facility in the U.S. The result was the newly developed Mercedes-Benz M-Class, which has been manufactured in Tuscaloosa, Alabama, since 1997. The luxurious SUV defined a new segment and was a market success. The vehicle has also been delivered to customers in Germany since 1998.

After managing the M-Class unit and serving as President and CEO of the production subsidiary Mercedes-Benz U.S. International Inc. (MBUSI), Renschler switched to the corporate headquarters in Stuttgart, where he was appointed Senior Vice President, Executive Management Development at DaimlerChrysler, the company that had recently been formed through the merger of Daimler and Chrysler.

Renschler was President of smart GmbH from 1999 to 2004. He stabilized the small car brand, cut costs, and opened up new markets in Asia. Today, the smart brand is the market leader in Germany’s micro-car segment and an integral part of the Daimler division Mercedes-Benz Cars.

In addition to his responsibilities at smart, Renschler was assigned to the Mitsubishi Motors Corporation (MMC) in Tokyo in spring 2004 in order to assess the strategic and operational options for MMC within the Daimler Group. As a result of this assessment, Daimler terminated its involvement in MMC.

On 1 October 2004, Renschler was appointed a member of the Daimler AG Board of Management, where he is responsible for Daimler Trucks and Daimler Buses. Daimler Trucks is the world’s largest truck manufacturer, and has the highest sales and returns of any bus manufacturer in the world.

Renschler resigned his positions at Daimler AG on 29 January 2014, after over 25 years with the company.

=== Volkswagen AG ===
On 1 February 2015, one year after leaving Daimler AG, Renschler was appointed to the Board of Management of Volkswagen AG, with responsibility for the commercial vehicles division. In assigning Renschler to this position, Volkswagen AG chairman Martin Winterkorn expects Renschler to integrate the operations of the Volkswagen commercial vehicles unit and its Scania and MAN subsidiaries.

== Professional commitments ==
- President of the Commercial Vehicle Board of the European Automobile Manufacturers Association (ACEA), 2008
- Member of the Supervisory Board of Tognum Group since 2008
- Member of the Board of Directors of Esslingen Technical College, 2000–2006
- Member of the Presidium of the Deutsches Verkehrsforum (German Traffic Forum) since 2006
- Member of the Supervisory Board of Daimler Financial Services AG since 2005
- Member of the Supervisory Board of Deutsche Messe AG since 2005
- Chairman of the Supervisory Board of EvoBus GmbH since 2005
- Member of the Supervisory Board of Mitsubishi Fuso Truck and Bus Corporation since 2005
- Director of the Executive Committee for Commercial Vehicles of the German Association of the Automotive Industry (VDA) since 2004
- Chairman of the Board of Directors of Reutlingen College since 1999
- Member of the Supervisory Board of MTU Friedrichshafen GmbH
- Chairman of the Supervisory Board of Daimler Trucks North America LLC
- Chairman of the Supervisory Board of Detroit Diesel Corporation

== Other ==
After Renschler had set up the Mercedes-Benz plant in Tuscaloosa, Alabama, in 1993, the region became a center of the automotive industry in the southern United States. Other manufacturers such as Toyota, Honda, and Hyundai subsequently settled in Alabama as well. Tuscaloosa still serves as a temporary home for many Germans, and the University of Alabama in Tuscaloosa even has a German Supplementary School. Renschler has also established an academic foundation. The Mercedes-Benz plant in Tuscaloosa is the largest employer in the region. Besides the M-Class, the plant has also been manufacturing the Mercedes-Benz R-Class and the Mercedes-Benz GL-Class since 2005.

Renschler is also involved in the Takenoko student exchange project between Germany and Japan.
