= CreateAI =

Chinese autonomous trucking company

CreateAI, Inc.
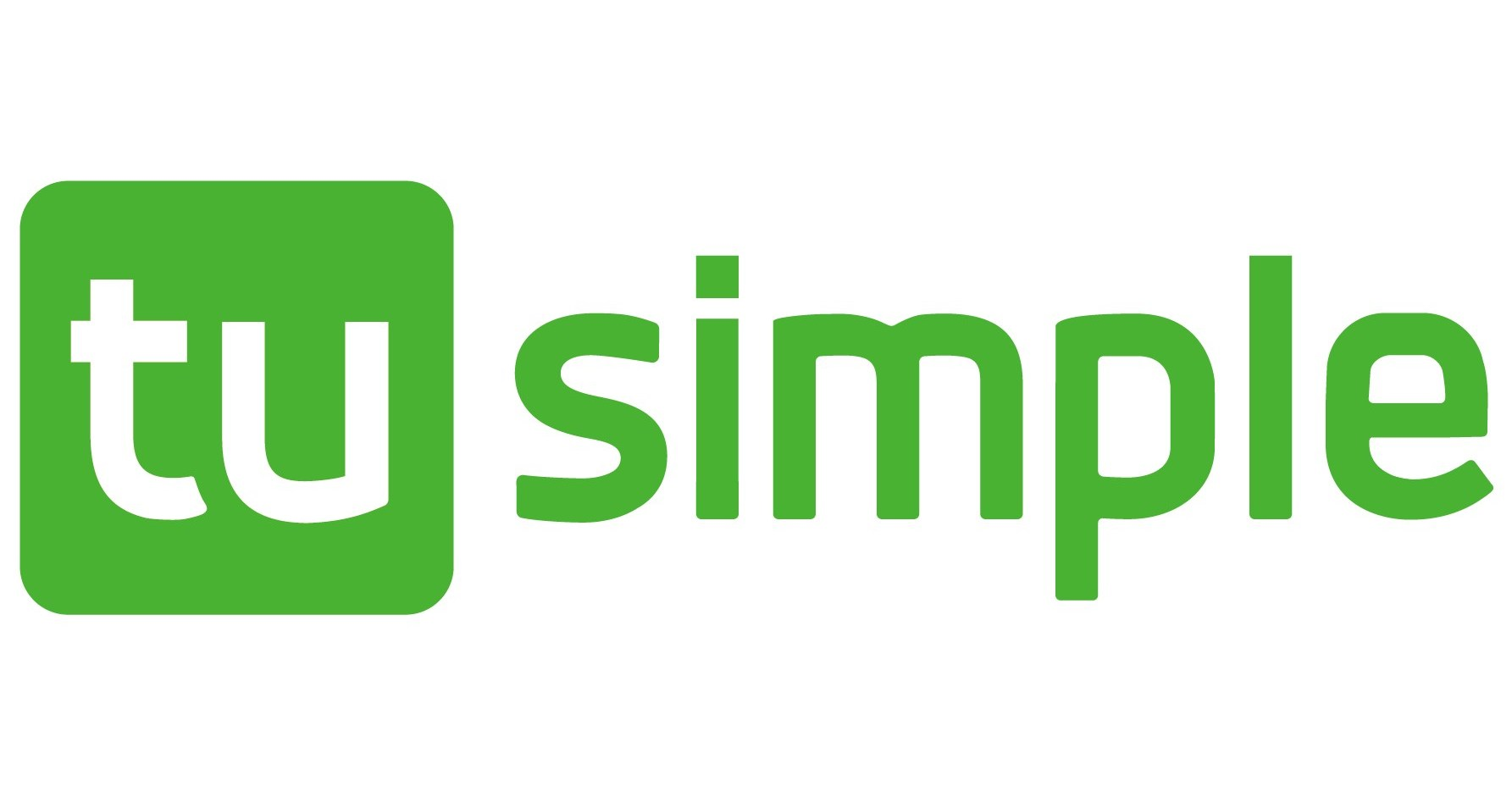
- Trade name: CreateAI
- Type: Public
- Traded as: OTCID Basic: TSPH
- Industry: Artificial intelligence,
- Founded: 2015; 11 years ago
- Founder: Mo Chen, Dr Xiaodi Hou
- Website: www.iamcreate.ai

CreateAI, Inc., formerly TuSimple Holdings, Inc., is an AI gaming technology company. It was founded as an autonomous trucking company in 2015 by Xiaodi Hou and Mo Chen. After allegations of illicit transfer of technology to a Chinese company by the leaders of TuSimple in December 2023, the company announced that it would be closing its U.S. business and moving to China.

In December 2024, the company announced that it was pivoting from autonomous trucking to AI gaming technology and rebranding under the name CreateAI.

== History ==
TuSimple was founded in September 2015 by Mo Chen and Dr Xiaodi Hou, who graduated from the California Institute of Technology. The company initially operated in two facilities: one in Beijing, China, and one in San Diego, California. Before 2022, TuSimple was a leader in the global race to develop self-driving trucks that could solve chronic driver shortages.

=== Partnerships ===
TuSimple established a number of partnerships to support the development and commercialization of the company. In August 2019, UPS announced a minority investment in the company and began testing TuSimple's autonomous trucks. In early 2020, TuSimple collaborated with automotive supplier ZF to develop sensor systems for autonomous vehicles.

In July 2020, the company announced plans with Navistar International Corp. to integrate self-driving technology into manufactured trucks, with commercial sales targeted for 2025. In September 2020, TuSimple also entered into an agreement with Traton Group to jointly develop trucks with autonomous technology. The same month, the company launched its Autonomous Freight Network (AFN) in partnership with UPS, U.S. Xpress, Penske Truck Leasing, and McLane, the grocery and food service supply chain of Berkshire Hathaway.

In January 2022, TuSimple announced the use of Nvidia's Drive Orin system on a chip at the Consumer Electronic Show.

=== Research ===
In late 2019, a study conducted by the University of California San Diego found that TuSimple's automation reduced the fuel consumption of trucks by 10-20%, with larger reductions in areas with more traffic.

==== Road testing ====
In December 2021, TuSimple announced that it had completed the world's first robotic semi test on a public road, an 80-mile run from Tucson to Phoenix. The company said it had completed 550 miles of autonomous operation in that route by early 2022 and claimed its trucks to be first "fully driverless heavy-duty trucks" since, unlike competitors, they did not have any local or remote human safety drivers.

On May 26, 2022, the Federal Motor Carrier Safety Administration and the U.S. National Highway Traffic Safety Administration launched an investigation of an April 6, 2022 accident in which one of the company's autonomous trucks crashed into a concrete barrier while on Interstate 10 near Tucson. Company officials blamed the accident on "human error," but former employees and experts in the field of autonomous vehicles suggest that there were issues with the company's technology. The investigation was closed in March 2023 and did not result in penalties. The company issued a statement that the National Highway Traffic Safety Administration declined to open a separate probe.

The company also announced that it planned to expand autonomous freight services to Texas by the end of 2023.

In March 2023, it was reported that the company had completed 10 million combined testing, research, and freight delivery miles. In June 2023, TuSimple announced that it had completed a series of fully autonomous semi-truck runs on public roads in China. Also in June, the company announced it had completed self-driving truck tests in Japan, on the Tōmei Expressway.

=== Illicit technology transfer ===
In October 2022, the company's CEO, Chief Technology Officer, and co-founder, Xiaodi Hou, was fired by the company's board, which cited a "loss in trust and confidence" in Hou's judgment in connection with an alleged sharing of confidential data, blueprints, and employee information with a Chinese company, Hydron Inc. Hydron Inc. is a hydrogen truck startup founded by Mo Chen, the other founder of TuSimple and backed by Sina. Hou responded to his ouster by stating that he would be "vindicated."

As of late 2022, TuSimple and its leadership were under investigation by the Federal Bureau of Investigation (FBI), U.S. Securities and Exchange Commission (SEC), and Committee on Foreign Investment in the United States (CFIUS) on suspicions of illicit technology transfer to Hydron in China. In February 2023, The Wall Street Journal reported that a member of the CFIUS panel recommended that the United States Department of Justice bring criminal charges of economic espionage against the management of TuSimple. At the time, a company spokeswoman denied being aware of any allegations of economic espionage against the company.

In January 2024, the United States Department of Commerce halted TuSimple's attempt to ship Nvidia processors to a newly formed subsidiary in Australia. A May 2025 report by The Wall Street Journal claimed that TuSimple continued to share its data with Chinese partners after signing a national-security agreement with the U.S. government in 2022 aimed at preventing the sharing of intellectual property. The data shared includes technical instructions for server dimensions, brake designs, sensors, steering, power supply, and chips - more or less the full design of an American-made autonomous driving system.

=== Financial health ===
Founded with money from Charles Chao of Sina, the company later raised funding from Volkswagen, United Parcel Service, and U.S. Xpress Enterprises. In April 2021, the company raised over US$1 billion in an initial public offering, leading to a valuation of almost $8.5 billion. The company was reportedly the first autonomous trucking company to go public on the NASDAQ composite index.

In the first half of 2022, TuSimple reported $220.5 million in losses and $4.9 million in revenue.

In December 2022, TuSimple announced a restructuring to focus more sharply on commercializing its newest technologies. As a result, TuSimple dismissed around a quarter of its workforce, amounting to at least 350 employees. TuSimple representatives estimated that the downsizing would cost them between $10 and $11 million.

TuSimple's stock also reported a 75% decrease from October 2022 and a 96% drop from their 2021 initial public offering price.

In December 2023, the company announced that it would be winding down its U.S. operations and moving its business to China. With a valuation of $229 million, the company is looking for a buyer.

In January 2024, TuSimple announced it was delisting from the NASDAQ. Facing shareholder lawsuits, a US federal judge issued an order restraining TuSimple from sharing trade secrets outside of the U.S. in order to protect shareholder asset claims. TuSimple subsequently suspended its operations in China.

=== Leadership changes ===
Cheng Lu served as TuSimple's CEO from September 2020 to March 2022 before he was ousted by Xiaodi Hou.

In October 2022, Hou was fired as CEO after an internal investigation about technology transfer to Hydron. Ersin Yumer, TuSimple's Chief Operations Officer, was named interim CEO. Co-founders Chen and Hou fired TuSimple's board of directors in response and reappointed Cheng Lu as CEO.

In March 2023, Hou resigned from TuSimple's board, stating a disagreement with his planned compensation and the company's shift in focus from level 4 to level 2 autonomy. Cheng Lu countered that TuSimple was still working toward level 4 autonomy and accused Hou of poaching employees.

== Technology ==
TuSimple uses a combination of LiDAR, radar, and HD cameras to detect vehicles and obstacles up to 1,000 meters away. Each truck consists of a computer that is connected to the TuSimple servers. Each of these servers, which are used to identify cars on the road and their speeds, contains as many as 100 A.I. models. The models receive data from the cameras' LiDAR and radar equipment and use it to build a live 3D model of the road.

In April 2023, the company announced a proprietary central computer unit called the TuSimple Domain Controller (TDC), designed to act as an autonomous truck's central computer, managing sensor inputs, vehicle control, and autonomous driving software. The TDC reportedly incorporated American technology company Nvidia's DRIVE Orin system-on-a-chip (SoC).

The company also operates the Autonomous Freight Network (AFN) that links four components: TuSimple's self-driving trucks, digitally mapped routes, freight terminals, and a system for monitoring autonomous trucks tracking shipments in real-time.
