= Plus (autonomous trucking) =

Self-driving truck technology company

- Formerly: Plus.ai
- Industry: Autonomous driving software
- Founded: 2016
- Founders: David Liu; Shawn Kerrigan; Hao Zheng; Tim Daly
- Headquarters: Santa Clara, California
- Area served: Worldwide
- Products: SuperDrive, PlusDrive, PlusProtect, PlusVision
- Website: plus.ai

Plus (also known as Plus Automation) is an American autonomous driving technology company based in Santa Clara, California. The company develops Level 4 autonomous driving technology for commercial freight trucks. In 2019, the company completed the first cross-country driverless freight delivery in the U.S. The company's self-driving system began to be used commercially in 2021.

== History ==
The company was founded in Silicon Valley, California in 2016, by a group of Stanford Ph.D. graduates who decided to use their knowledge of artificial intelligence to develop self-driving technology for the long-haul trucking industry. Plus was one of the first companies working on autonomous trucks to receive a California Autonomous Vehicle Testing License the following year, allowing it to test its technology in California.

The company began operating in China during 2018 in addition to the US. Plus also demonstrated its technology in an unmanned truck at Qingdao Port in China that same year. Chinese online freight marketplace, Full Truck Alliance, became an investor in Plus in 2018. In 2019 the company entered into a joint venture with the Chinese truck manufacturer FAW Jiefang.

A commercial freight truck using Plus's self-driving technology drove across the U.S. from California to Pennsylvania in December 2019, hauling butter for Land O'Lakes. According to Popular Mechanics, this was the first time that an autonomous freight vehicle had driven across the country delivering goods.

In early 2021, Plus raised two rounds of funding. In February, it raised a total investment of $200 million. As an extension to that funding, it raised an additional $220 million in March 2021. In April 2021, Plus started a partnership with IVECO, an Italy-based commercial vehicle manufacturer, to develop and deploy driver-in and Level 4 autonomous trucks with Plus's self-driving technology.

The company announced in May 2021 that it had established a deal to go public through a business combination with the special-purpose acquisition company (SPAC), Hennessy Capital Investment Corp. V. The companies canceled the planned merger in November 2021, citing regulatory concerns outside of the U.S.

Also in May 2021, Plus carried out a 4,000-mile drive from Suzhou to Dunhuang on China's Silk Road to test the safety and performance of its self-driving system. The truck was autonomous but supervised during the drive.

The following month, Amazon.com made an order to purchase 1,000 self-driving systems from the company. Plus had started to deliver its self-driving technology to Amazon in February 2021. In a separate deal, Amazon gained the option to purchase up to a 20% stake in Plus.

The company completed a driverless truck demonstration on the Wufengshan highway in China, in June 2021. The driverless semi truck was operated using Plus's Level 4 autonomous driving technology, without a safety driver or use of any remote controls.

In May 2023, Plus and Bosch announced a collaboration to combine Plus’ PlusDrive solution with Bosch's integrated steering system featuring software, sensors, vehicle computers, and actuators to provide Level 2 partial automation solution for commercial vehicles. In November, Plus, IVECO, DSV, and dm-drogerie market, launched an automated trucking pilot in Germany where IVECO S-Way trucks equipped with Plus's automated system are delivering commercial freight between the dm distribution center in Waghäusel and the DSV distribution center in Gernsheim. In August, Plus expanded to Australia through a collaboration with toll-road operator, Transurban, and IVECO to bring Level 4 driverless trucks to Australia.

In March 2024, Plus announced a long-term global partnership with Scania/MAN/Navistar brands of the Traton Group to deploy Level 4 autonomous trucks, with testing underway in Texas and Sweden. In May, Plus and Hyundai Motor Company announced their collaboration and demonstrated the first Level 4 autonomous Class 8 hydrogen fuel cell electric truck in the United States, an Xcient Fuel Cell truck with Plus's SuperDrive Level 4 self-driving technology. Later in July, Plus and Ambarella announced that its transformer-based perception stack PlusVision can run on Ambarella system-on-a-chip.

In June 2025, the company announced its intention to go public in a SPAC, which is planned to yield $300 million and value the company at $1.2 billion.

== Product and technology ==
Plus is developing Level 4 self-driving technology called SuperDrive for semi trucks . The company developed a self-driving system called PlusDrive intended for use with a driver in the vehicle, which can be retrofitted into commercial freight trucks. The company's self-driving system incorporates hardware and software using artificial intelligence. The hardware employed by Plus includes cameras, lidar and radar that together provide a complete view of the truck's surroundings. The software processes and makes sense of all data about the truck's surroundings collected through the sensors.

The company has carried out road testing of its technology in 48 states in the U.S. as of 2021. In addition to its own road testing, Plus's technology is independently tested at the Transportation Research Center.

Plus has partnered with truck manufacturers and trucking fleets to introduce its driving systems. It began to roll out its system to companies in China and the U.S. in 2021 and announced that it would begin production that year. As of 2024, the company is working with Bosch, Cummins, dm-drogerie markt, DSV, Goodyear, Hyundai Motor Company, IVECO, NVIDIA, Scania/MAN/Navistar of the TRATON GROUP and Transurban on autonomous transportation.

== Operations ==
The company is based in Silicon Valley, with headquarters in Santa Clara, California, and offices in Fremont, Munich. It carries out testing of trucks in the U.S., Australia, and Europe.

The company is co-founded and led by CEO David Liu, chief operating officer Shawn Kerrigan, chief technology officer Hao Zheng, and chief architect Tim Daly.

In 2023, Plus separated its U.S. and Chinese-focused operations into two independent companies, with the U.S. unit retaining the Plus name and Full Truck Alliance becoming a key shareholder of the Chinese unit, Zhijia Technology.
