= Autonomous Solutions =

Spinoff from Utah State University

Autonomous Solutions, Inc.
- Type: Private
- Industry: Vehicle automation (mining, farming, automotive, agricultural, military, logistics, security)
- Founded: November 1, 2000
- Headquarters: Mendon, Utah, United States
- Key people: Mel Torrie (president and CEO)
- Website: asirobots.com

Autonomous Solutions, Inc. (ASI) was founded in 2000 as a spinoff from Utah State University and is headquartered in Mendon, Utah. ASI provides an OEM/vendor independent automation technology to create fully autonomous vehicles by retrofitting existing equipment.

ASI enables vendor-agnostic ground vehicle automation, centered around their Mobius fleet orchestration and management software and custom hardware kits. ASI currently operates in 8 markets: Mining, Proving Ground Automation, Agriculture, Logistics, Construction, Security, Research and Military.

== History ==
- Autonomous Solutions was founded in 2000 when it was spun off from the Center for Self-Organizing and Intelligent Systems (CSOIS) division of Utah State University in Logan, Utah, to develop precision agriculture technologies for John Deere.
- The company first moved to Wellsville, Utah, and then in 2007 relocated to Petersboro, Utah. The Petersboro headquarters is a 100-acre proving ground facility where hardware engineering, software engineering, and much of the robotics testing takes place.
- In 2006, Autonomous Solutions entered the mining industry offering a vendor-independent solution to mining end users. Mining is currently one of ASI's four premier markets.
- ASI has participated in the DARPA Grand Challenge (2007).
- In 2011, ASI-led team wins the Robotic Range Clearance Competition (R2C2). sponsored by the US-Department of Defense.
- In 2011, ASI entered the automotive market with specific offerings for automotive proving grounds for autonomous durability and endurance testing.
- June 2013, Ford Motor Company announced that it had been working with ASI as their preferred automation supplier for their robotic durability testing program. The program runs durability tests 24/7 with the use of ASI vehicle automation technology and was specifically launched to remove human durability drivers from Ford's most physically punishing durability tracks.

== Notable installations ==
=== Bingham Canyon Mine ===
In April 2013, a massive landslide rocked the Bingham Canyon Mine (Kennecott Utah Copper/Rio Tinto Group). Between 135 and 165 million tons shifted, collapsing one side of the world's largest open pit mine. Autonomous Solutions was contacted to assist in the cleanup efforts by providing remote control automation for 6 excavators (four CAT 375D and two CAT 390D). The excavators were used to safely move millions of tons of material from the most unstable areas at the top of the slide area.

=== Ford Robotic Durability Testing Program ===
On June 14, 2013, Ford Motor Company issued a press release detailing their robotic durability testing program. This program allows vehicles to be tested on the most punishing test tracks without the risk previously experienced with human drivers. Using ASI's vehicle automation products testing can run 24/7 without compromising quality of the testing.

=== LAPD BatCat ===
The Los Angeles Police Department contracted Autonomous Solutions to provide the automation piece for a teleoperated CAT telehandler. The telehandler, named BatCat, has seen action in several high-profile situations involving bomb threats and active shooters.
