= Aurora Innovation =

Self-driving vehicle technology company

Aurora Innovation, Inc.
- Trade name: Aurora
- Type: Public
- Traded as: Nasdaq: AUR (Class A); Russell 2000 component
- Industry: Self-driving truck
- Founded: 2017; 9 years ago
- Founders: Chris Urmson; Sterling Anderson; Drew Bagnell
- Headquarters: Pittsburgh, Pennsylvania and Mountain View, California, U.S.
- Key people: Chris Urmson (chairman and CEO); David Maday (CFO); Reid Hoffman (director)
- Revenue: ▼US$68 million (2022)
- Net income: ▼US$−1.723 billion (2022)
- Total assets: ▼US$2.001 billion (2022)
- Total equity: ▼US$1.784 billion (2022)
- Owner: Uber (26%)
- Number of employees: 1,700 (2022)
- Website: aurora.tech

Aurora Innovation, Inc., doing business as Aurora, is a self-driving vehicle technology company based in Pittsburgh, Pennsylvania. Aurora has developed the Aurora Driver, a computer system that can be integrated into vehicles for autonomous driving. It was co-founded by Chris Urmson, the former chief technology officer of Google/Alphabet Inc.'s self-driving team, which became known as Waymo, as well as by Sterling Anderson, former head of Tesla Autopilot, and Drew Bagnell, former head of Uber's autonomy and perception team.

Aurora tests vehicles that use its technology in the San Francisco Bay Area, Pittsburgh, and Dallas. In addition to its headquarters in Pittsburgh, the company also has had offices in Mountain View, California; San Francisco; Bozeman, Montana; Detroit, Michigan; Louisville, Colorado; Seattle, Washington; and Texas.

== History ==
Aurora was founded in 2017 by Chris Urmson, the former chief technology officer of Google/Alphabet Inc.'s self-driving team, which became known as Waymo. Previously, Urmson was a member of Carnegie Mellon's Red Team, which competed in DARPA's Grand Challenges for autonomous vehicles. His two co-founders are Sterling Anderson, former head of Tesla Autopilot, and Drew Bagnell, former head of Uber's autonomy and perception team. Anderson left Aurora in May 2025 and joined General Motors (GM) in June.

In January 2018, Aurora signed deals with Volkswagen and Hyundai to develop self-driving software for commercial vehicles. Also in January 2018, at CES 2018, Nvidia partnered with Aurora to provide hardware for Aurora's self-driving systems.

In October 2018, Aurora became the first self-driving vehicle company authorized to test its vehicles in Pennsylvania.

In January 2019, the company raised financing at a $2 billion valuation.

In May 2019, Aurora acquired Blackmore, a Bozeman, Montana-based company focusing on Frequency Modulated Continuous Wave (FMCW) lidar. In June 2019, Aurora announced a partnership with Fiat Chrysler Automobiles to develop self-driving technology in commercial vans. As a result of this partnership, the company was able to acquire Chrysler Pacifica minivans for its fleet of test vehicles. In June 2019, Volkswagen also announced they would be ending their partnership with Aurora.

Aurora expanded its operations to Texas in June 2020, bringing a fleet of test vehicles into the Dallas-Fort Worth area. In July 2020, Aurora debuted its own long-range lidar system called "FirstLight."

In September 2020, the company moved its headquarters to the Strip District.

In December 2020, Aurora acquired Advanced Technologies Group (ATG), Uber's self-driving unit. Uber CEO Dara Khosrowshahi subsequently joined Aurora's board of directors. Uber also invested $400 million in Aurora and took a 26% ownership stake in the company.

In January 2021, Aurora partnered with Paccar to develop its first commercial product, a driverless truck. Their technology will be paired with Paccar's Peterbilt 579 and Kenworth T680 semi-trucks.

In February 2021, Aurora partnered with Toyota and Denso to develop self-driving taxis.

In March 2021, Aurora acquired 5D lidar company OURS Technology, a silicon photonics startup. Also in March, Aurora announced it was partnering with Volvo Group to develop driverless trucks.

In November 2021, the company became a public company via a merger with Reinvent Technology Partners Y, a special-purpose acquisition company set up by Reid Hoffman and Mark Pincus which provided $2 billion in additional funding.

In March 2022, Aurora unveiled its test fleet of autonomous Toyota Sienna robotaxi. Following this, In May 2022, Aurora announced the development of the Aurora Beacon platform. The platform is a cloud-based mission control system designed for customers to optimise operations of autonomous vehicles via real time metrics such as status, location, and health of vehicles.

In May 2022, Aurora announced the expansion of the organization's self-driving freight pilot with FedEx. The expansion is to include service from Fort Worth to El Paso, Texas. The new route challenged the company for its longest freight truck journey of about 600 miles, in which they will operate on a weekly basis. As of May, Aurora and FedEx have completed a total of 60,000 miles with zero safety incidents, according to the company.

In March 2023, Aurora had 28 Class 8 self-driving trucks that run on public roads and are used with safety backup drivers. Aurora issued a joint application along with Waymo to the Federal Motor Carrier Safety Administration. The companies requested a five-year exemption from rules that require drivers to place reflective triangles or a flare around a stopped tractor-trailer truck, to alert other drivers. Waymo and Aurora instead want to use warning beacons mounted on the truck cab, to avoid needing human drivers.

In April 2023, Aurora partnered with Continental to deliver autonomous driving systems for the trucking industry.

In May 2023, Aurora was featured in Barack Obama's Netflix docuseries Working: What We Do All Day.

In June 2023, David Maday replaced Richard Tame as CFO. In January 2025, Uber CEO Dara Khosrowshahi resigned from Aurora's board of directors.

In May 2024, Aurora and Volvo Trucks unveiled the Class 8 Volvo VNL Autonomous at ACT Expo.

=== Executive changes ===
In May 2025, Sterling Anderson, Aurora's co-founder and Chief Product Officer, announced his resignation, effective June 1. He also stepped down from the company's board of directors on August 31. Anderson stated that his departure was not due to any disagreements with Aurora's operations or policies. He expressed that leaving was a difficult decision but felt confident in the company's trajectory, noting that Aurora had reached a critical inflection point with established product strategy, deployed technology, and a team poised for scaling.

=== Expansion of driverless trucking operations ===
In the second half of 2025, Aurora plans to expand its driverless trucking operations to include night driving and operation during adverse weather conditions, such as rain and heavy winds. The company also intends to extend its driverless routes beyond the Dallas–Houston corridor to include El Paso, Texas, and Phoenix, Arizona. Aurora's CFO, Dave Maday, indicated that enabling night operations could potentially double the company's drive time, enhancing asset utilization.

As of May 2025, Aurora operates two driverless trucks on a daily basis and expects to scale up to "tens of trucks" by the end of the year. The company plans to own, operate, maintain, and insure its own trucks for carrier customers in the short term, with some trucks available on the Uber Freight network. Starting in 2027 or earlier, Aurora anticipates that customers will purchase self-driving trucks directly from manufacturers, transitioning to a driver-as-a-service model aimed at achieving higher gross margins.

== Products ==
The company developed the Aurora Driver, a system that consists of sensors, software, and hardware. It can be installed in passenger or commercial automobiles, converting them into self-driving vehicles. The Aurora Driver's software uses data from its sensors to devise a safe path through a given route, while its computer powers these components and integrates them with the vehicle. The system's sensors use Aurora's FirstLight lidar, which was developed from Blackmore's FMCW lidar technology. The first vehicle to be outfitted with the Aurora Driver was the Toyota Sienna.

Conventional lidar uses pulses of light to acquire information about objects surrounding the sensor, including distance and velocity. In contrast, FMCW lidar uses a low-powered continuous beam of light, enabling faster acquisition of distance, velocity, and acceleration of surrounding objects, but often requires bulky mirrors and rangefinders. By acquiring OURS, Aurora hopes to reduce the size of the FMCW lidar hardware.

In 2022, Aurora unveiled "Fusion", the next generation of its hardware kit, which combined the company's FirstLight lidar, imaging radar and cameras with a more powerful onboard computer and debuted in commercial pilots. Aurora launched commercial driverless trucking operations on the Dallas–Houston corridor in late April 2025. In the third quarter of 2025, the company reported surpassing 100,000 driverless miles on public roads with no safety incidents attributed to the system, operating five driverless trucks, and opened a second freight route between Fort Worth and El Paso. Aurora plans to launch a second-generation commercial hardware kit in the second quarter of 2026, intended to roughly halve hardware costs while doubling the range of its FirstLight lidar to 1,000 meters and improving all-weather operation. Manufactured by Fabrinet, this kit is being integrated with platforms including the Volvo VNL Autonomous and the International LT Series. A third-generation, highly scalable hardware system co-developed with AUMOVIO (formerly Continental) is slated for production in 2027.

== See also ==
- Argo AI
