= Gatik =

Self-driving trucking and delivering company

- Type: Private
- Industry: Vehicular automation, delivery
- Founded: 2017; 9 years ago
- Founder: Gautam Narang; Arjun Narang; Apeksha Kumavat
- Headquarters: Mountain View, California, United States
- Key people: Gautam Narang (CEO)
- Website: gatik.ai

Gatik is an autonomous trucking and delivery company that operates in the United States and Canada. The company creates Level 4 autonomous trucking technology for vehicles making middle mile commercial deliveries. Gatik is currently headquartered in Mountain View, California and has offices in Arkansas, Fort Worth, Texas and Toronto, Ontario.

== History ==
Gatik was established in 2017 by Gautam Narang, Arjun Narang, and Apeksha Kumavat. Around this time, Texas passed a law allowing autonomous vehicles to drive on its roads and highways. The company operated in stealth mode for the first two years to develop its technology.

Gatik approached Arkansas House representative Austin McCollum in 2019 to introduce legislation allowing for an autonomous vehicle pilot program. The bill was signed into law by Asa Hutchinson. Gatik and Walmart consequently launched a partnership in 2019, beginning pilot program operations consisting of a 1.8-mile route between a fulfillment center and the retailer's Bentonville, Arkansas location. Initially, a “driver” rode in the driver’s seat of the self-driving trucks; by 2021, the vehicles went driverless, with the safety driver moving to the passenger seat. Safety drivers can still manually stop the vehicle if the autonomous driving system disengages. By November 2021, Gatik was operating 21 vehicles.

In January 2020, Gatik deployed Canada's first autonomous delivery fleet with supermarket chain Loblaw in Ontario, Canada.

The company began making grocery deliveries for PC Express in Brampton, Ontario on a 13-mile route as of October 5, 2022. The deliveries were made using autonomous trucks with no safety driver behind the steering wheel. Gatik is now used by Kroger and Tyson Foods for this purpose.

== Technology ==
Gatik focuses on medium-distance deliveries, commonly referred to as the "middle mile", using Level 4 autonomous trucks to transport groceries and other goods between distribution centers, micro-fulfillment centers and retail locations. Gatik's Level 4 autonomous trucks operate without a safety driver on repeated routes.

The company began making its first deliveries using Ford Transit vans integrated with Gatik's autonomous technology. Gatik introduced an electric version of its Ford Transit delivery truck in February 2021, which was developed together with electric vehicle manufacturer VIA Motors.

In April 2021, Gatik partnered with Isuzu to develop an autonomous medium-duty truck. Gatik integrated its autonomous trucking technology into the Isuzu N-Series truck.

Starting in 2022, Cummins has also worked with Gatik to integrate the company's autonomous vehicle technology into Cummins' powertrain software, enabling the use of drive by wire in autonomous vehicles. The companies installed the technology into Isuzu FTR box trucks.

In 2024, Gatik's trucks started to use data-collecting tires from Goodyear.

In July 2025, technology from NVIDIA was integrated into Gatik's next-generation simulation platform, enabling higher-fidelity environment simulations for autonomous truck validation and development at lower cost.
