= Einride =

Swedish transport company

Einride AB
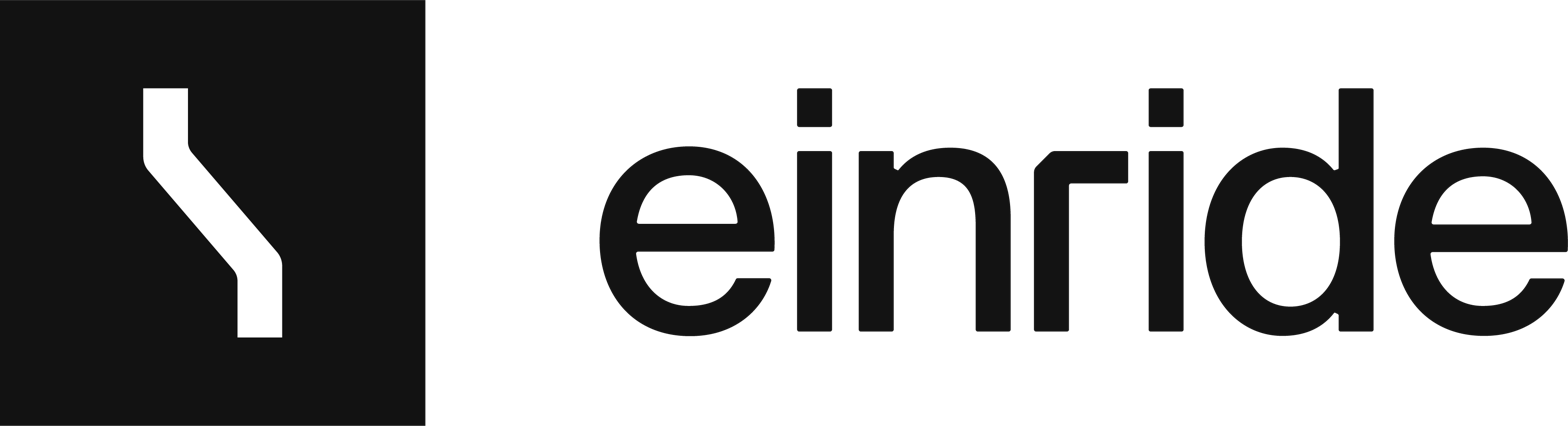
- Industry: Automotive, technology
- Founded: 2016
- Founder: Robert Falck, Filip Lilja, Linnéa Kornehed
- Headquarters: Stockholm, Sweden
- Website: www.einride.tech

Einride AB is a Swedish transport company based in Stockholm, Sweden, specializing in electric and self-driving vehicles. The electric trucks are remotely controlled by drivers, and are notable for their lack of a driver's cab.

== History ==
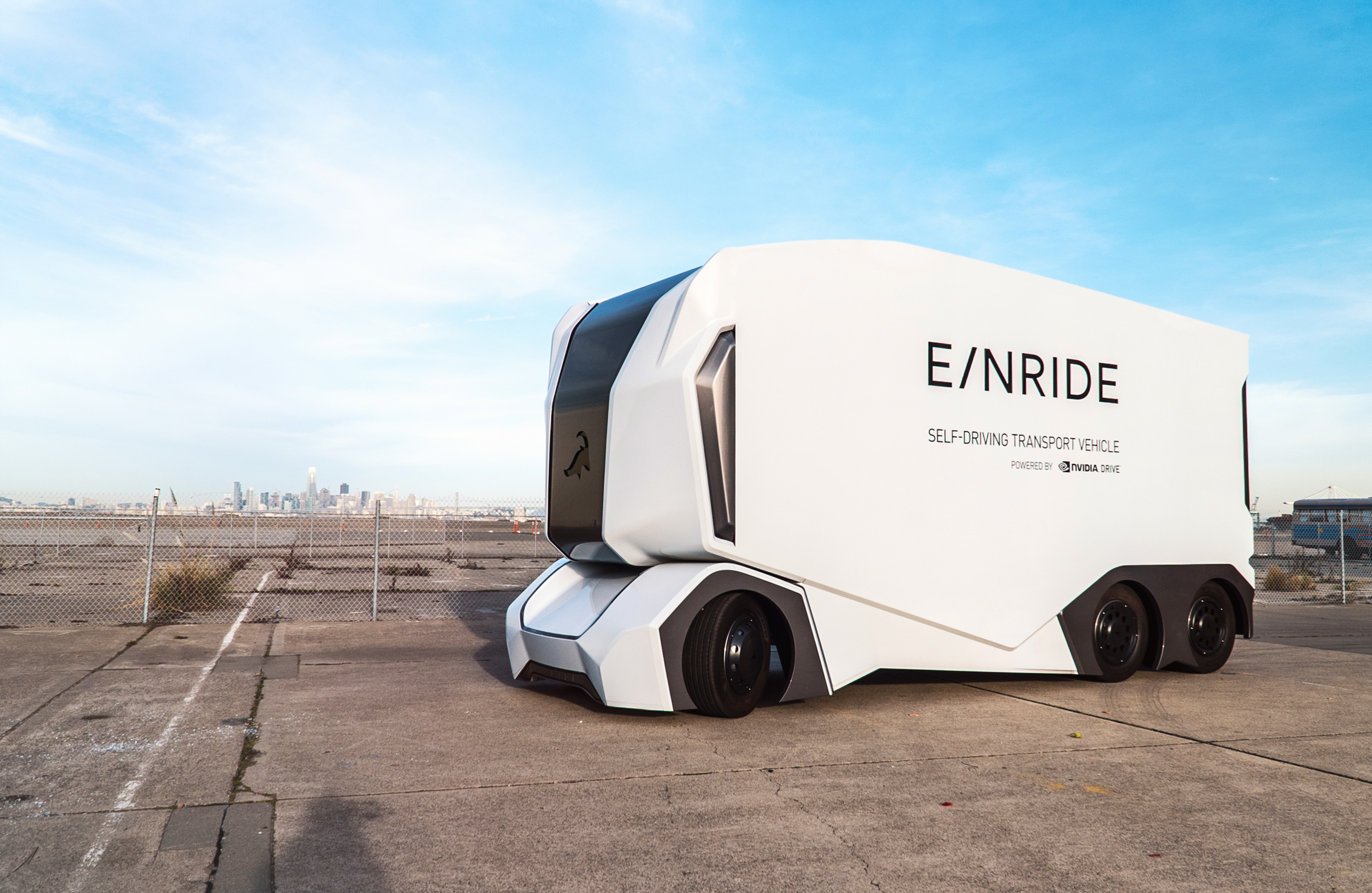
The Einride Autonomous Electric Truck in front of San Francisco skyline

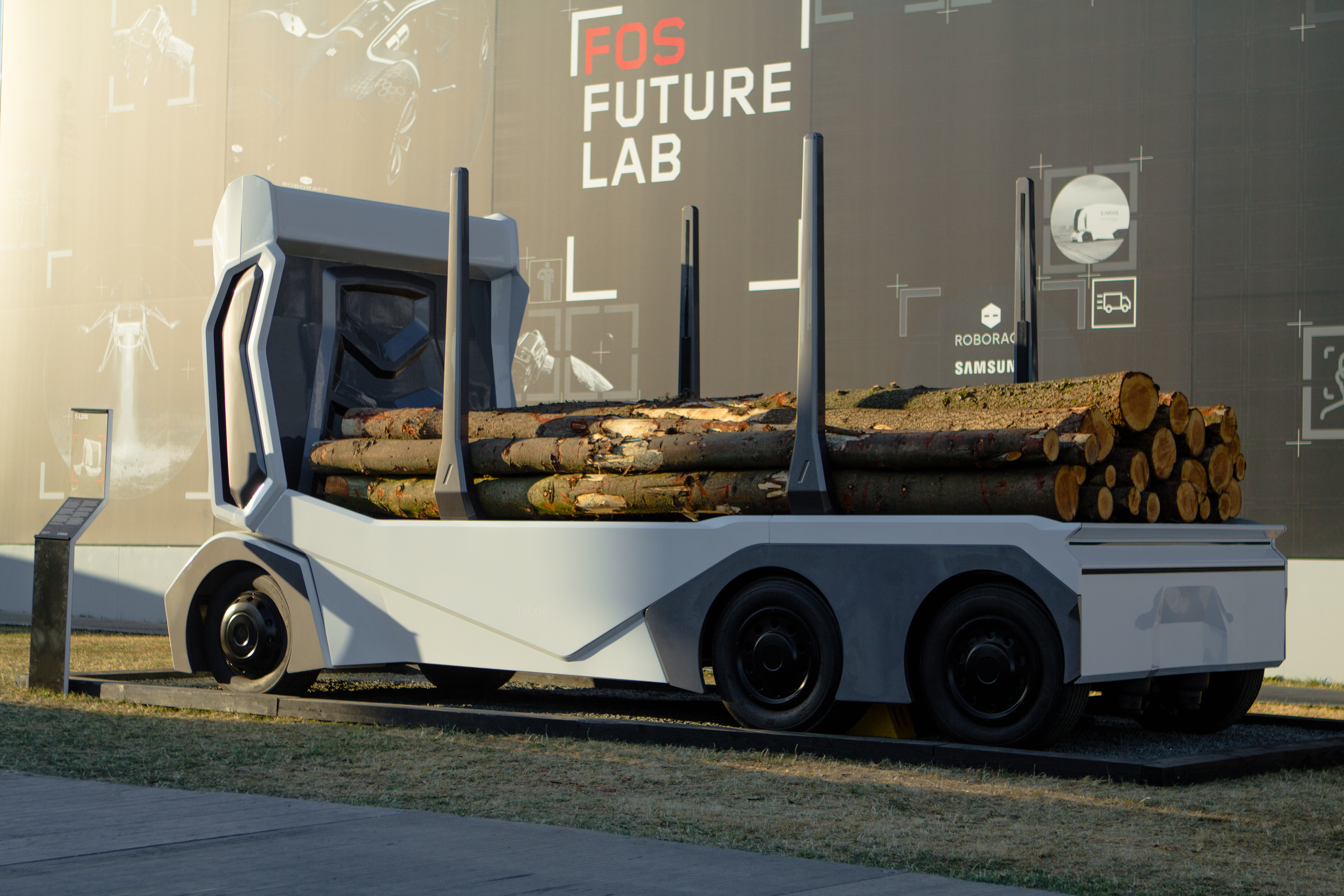
The Einride Autonomous Electric Truck at the Goodwood Festival of Speed

=== Early history and founding ===
The company was founded in 2016 by Robert Falck, Filip Lilja and Linnéa Kornehed. The company manufactures electric and self-driving vehicles. The company name is a reference to the Nordic god of thunder and lightning, Thor, and means "the lone rider". In the Spring of 2017, the company introduced their transport vehicle, an Autonomous Electric Truck (AET), formerly known as the T-pod and later as the Einride pod, an electric truck which does not contain a cabin. The first full-scale prototype of what was then called the T-Pod was revealed on July 4, 2017, at Almedalen Week in Visby, Sweden. Einride also announced a 2017 partnerships with Lidl and DB Schenker in 2018. On July 12, 2018, as part of Future Lab at the Goodwood Festival of Speed, Einride launched an autonomous and all-electric logging truck.

On November 5, 2018, Einride launched the first commercial installation of the Einride autonomous truck at a DB Schenker facility in Jönköping, Sweden. In May 2019, an Einride vehicle started daily deliveries on a public road there; it was permitted to go at up to 5 km per hour.

=== 2020 to present ===
In June 2020, Einride introduced the freight mobility platform, a software suite that analyzes transport networks for electric or autonomous vehicle potential and provides recommendations for implementation. In October 2021, Einride finalized an agreement with General Electric (GE) Appliances for first fleet of autonomous electric trucks.

In March 2022, Einride investor Maersk ordered 300 Class 8 trucks through Einride, built by BYD in California. Later that year, the company received approval to operate its vehicles on US roads.

== Technology ==
Einride uses self-driving technology as well as remote operation for the Einride Autonomous Electric Truck which allows drivers to monitor multiple vehicles and remotely control the vehicle in difficult traffic situations. The Einride Autonomous Electric Truck can travel 200 km (124 miles) on a fully charged battery.
