= Traton =

European vehicle manufacturing company

Traton SE
- Formerly: Truck & Bus GmbH; Volkswagen Truck & Bus GmbH; Volkswagen Truck & Bus AG; Traton AG
- Type: Public
- Traded as: FWB: 8TRA; MDAX component
- ISIN: DE000TRAT0N7
- Industry: Automotive
- Predecessor: Volkswagen Group's heavy vehicle operations
- Founded: 6 June 2013; 13 years ago
- Headquarters: Munich, Germany
- Key people: Christian Levin (CEO)
- Products: Commercial vehicles
- Revenue: ▼€44.05 billion (2025)
- Operating income: ▼€2.77 billion (2025)
- Net income: ▼€1.55 billion (2025)
- Total assets: ▲€68.20 billion (2025)
- Total equity: ▲€18.64 billion (2025)
- Number of employees: ▲107.755 (31 December 2025)
- Parent: Volkswagen Group (87.5%)
- Subsidiaries: Scania AB; MAN Truck & Bus; International Motors; Volkswagen Truck & Bus; Sinotruk (25%, joint venture)
- Website: traton.com

Traton SE, known as the Traton Group (formerly Volkswagen Truck & Bus AG), is a subsidiary of the Volkswagen Group and one of the world's largest commercial vehicle manufacturers, with its Scania, MAN, International, Volkswagen Truck & Bus, IC Bus and Neoplan brands. The company also has digital services branded as RIO. In 2025, the group sold 305,486 vehicles. The range of products includes light-, medium-, and heavy-duty trucks, as well as vans and buses. As of December 31, 2025, Traton employed around 108,000 people in its commercial vehicle brands.

== History ==
In 1979, Volkswagen AG held a 67% share in Chrysler Motors do Brasil Ltda., a Brazilian commercial vehicle manufacturer. In 1980, Volkswagen acquired the remaining shares in Chrysler, renamed the company Volkswagen Caminhões e Ônibus Ltda., and assigned it to the Volkswagen Commercial Vehicles division.

In 2000, Volkswagen contributed 3 billion German marks to Swedish Scania AB, controlling 34% of the voting rights and holding 18.7% of the share capital. In 2006, MAN SE presented Volkswagen and the other Scania shareholders with a takeover offer in the amount of 9.6 billion euros. A few days later, Volkswagen rejected the offer, and broached the subject of a potential truck alliance for the first time.

In October 2006, Volkswagen AG announced that it had acquired 15% of MAN SE, but did not intend to take over. On 12 October 2006, MAN SE increased its takeover bid to Scania by 400 million euros, bringing it to a total of 10 billion euros. At the same time, it bought additional shares, giving it control of about 14% of Scania AB. After the partners also rejected the revised offer, MAN withdrew the offer in January 2007, and began talks about a possible alliance between the three companies. To further consolidate this alliance, Volkswagen acquired another 14.9% of MAN. Shortly afterwards, Volkswagen announced that it now held 35.3% of the Scania voting rights. Volkswagen acquired a further 30.62% of the voting rights from the Swedish Investor AB and the Wallenberg foundations in March 2008. Volkswagen had already controlled this share in the past by means of an agreement with the existing shareholders.

In December 2008, Volkswagen AG sold the Brazilian subsidiary Volkswagen Caminhões e Ônibus Ltda. to MAN SE for 1.2 billion euros. The company was incorporated into MAN Latin America Ltda. under a new name, selling the majority of its heavy trucks and buses under the Volkswagen Caminhões e Ônibus brand, alongside MAN Truck and Bus products.

Volkswagen acquired further MAN SE shares at the beginning of May 2011 and was obliged to submit a takeover offer, which it did at the end of the same month. Volkswagen held the majority of voting rights at 55.9% at the end of the acceptance period. As part of further share purchases, Volkswagen announced voting rights of 75.03% on 6 June 2012. Due to the resulting statutory blocking minority of 25%, Volkswagen was given sole control of MAN SE. On 16 April 2013, Volkswagen AG applied for “Truck & Bus GmbH” to be entered into the commercial register of the city of Wolfsburg. On forming this new subsidiary, Volkswagen transferred the shares it held in MAN SE, with which Truck & Bus GmbH signed a control and profit transfer agreement on 6 June 2013. Volkswagen AG held more than 89% of the Scania AB voting rights as a result of the shares in Scania held by its subsidiary, MAN.

In February 2014, Volkswagen issued a voluntary public takeover bid to the remaining shareholders of Scania. At the end of the acceptance period in June 2014, Volkswagen held 99.57% of the voting rights. Following the squeeze-out under Swedish law, Volkswagen AG became the holder of 82.63% of the voting rights directly and another 17.37% via MAN SE.

At the beginning of July 2015, the shareholders' meeting of Truck & Bus GmbH decided to rename it Volkswagen Truck & Bus GmbH, a company based in Braunschweig. Andreas Renschler, at that time responsible for the commercial vehicles on the board of management of Volkswagen AG, became CEO. Martin Winterkorn was appointed as chairman of the supervisory board. The shares Volkswagen held in Scania were transferred to the renamed holding company. Volkswagen Commercial Vehicles remained part of Volkswagen AG.

In 2016, Volkswagen Truck & Bus acquired a 16.6% stake in U.S. commercial vehicle maker Navistar International Corporation. Both companies entered into a strategic technology and supply cooperation initiative and established a purchasing joint venture.

On 20 June 2018, Volkswagen Truck & Bus was announced as being renamed Traton, effective from the third quarter of 2018.

On 26 June 2018, Volkswagen Truck & Bus GmbH was transformed into a German stock corporation (Aktiengesellschaft), becoming Volkswagen Truck & Bus AG.

In August 2018, Volkswagen Truck & Bus was renamed Traton AG. The company used this new name at the IAA 2018 press conference with the tagline "Transforming Transportation". Followed by the transformation into a European company (Societas Europaea or SE) in December 2018, the company was renamed Traton SE. The name stands for TRAnsformation, TRAnsportation, TRAdition, TONnage and always “ON”.

On 28 June 2019, Traton was listed at the Frankfurt and Stockholm stock exchange. The placement price for the dual listing was set at 27.00 euros per share. About 57,500,000 ordinary bearer shares from Volkswagen AG's holdings were placed with investors, 11.5% of Traton's share capital. Volkswagen raised 1.55 billion euros.

In 2018, Volkswagen Truck & Bus and Hino Motors announced a wide-ranging strategic partnership for activities including procurement, technologies, and logistics. In November 2019, they established a procurement joint venture called Hino and Traton Global Procurement, with 51% of it owned by Traton and 49% by Hino. By 2023, the partnership was terminated.

On 30 January 2020, Traton announced a proposal to purchase all outstanding shares in Navistar.

In February 2020, Traton announced that it intended to absorb MAN SE by merging to simplify Traton's overall structure. As a result of the merger, MAN Truck & Bus SE, Scania AB, and Volkswagen Caminhões e Ônibus were to become wholly owned direct subsidiaries of Traton. The merging of the MAN company into Traton was completed in August 2021.

In September 2020, Traton formed a partnership with TuSimple, a self-driving trucking technology company, to co-develop level-4 autonomous trucks by equipping Traton's Scania trucks with automated vehicle technology. As part of this new partnership, Traton has invested in TuSimple. The respective development agreement between the companies was ended in December 2022.

On 1 July 2021, Traton successfully completed its takeover of Navistar.

On 18 May 2022, Volkswagen Caminhões e Ônibus announced it was changing its corporate name to Volkswagen Truck and Bus, one of its parent's former names.

On 25 September 2024, Traton subsidiary Navistar announced its rebranding to International Motors, LLC, effective 1 October 2024. The company also introduced a new logo and corporate identity as part of the transition. Traton subsidiary Scania opened a new plant in Rugao, China, in October 2025. According to media reports, Scania is the first western OEM to run a factory in China that is entirely foreign-owned.

== Corporate structure ==
=== Integration into the Volkswagen Group ===
Traton forms the Commercial Vehicles Business Area of the Volkswagen Group, which owns a 87.5% majority shareholding. The Commercial Vehicles Business Area formerly included the Volkswagen Commercial Vehicles brand, but following changes in the management structure of the Volkswagen Group, the Volkswagen Commercial Vehicles brand was reallocated to the Passenger Cars Business Area from 1 January 2019. In 2024, Volkswagen announced plans to reduce its ownership of Traton to 75%, selling shares its shares as free float.

Scania AB, MAN Truck & Bus SE, International Motors, LLC and Volkswagen Truck & Bus are all wholly owned subsidiaries of Traton, which also holds 25% + 1 share of Sinotruk.

=== Leadership ===
- Andreas Renschler (2015–2020)
- Matthias Gründler (2020–2021)
- Christian Levin (2021–Present)

== Brands ==
The following active brands operate under the Traton Group:

Brand	Origin	Established	CEO
Scania	Sweden	1911	Christian Levin
MAN	Germany	1893	Alexander Vlaskamp
Neoplan	Germany	1935	Alexander Vlaskamp
International	United States	1902	Mathias Carlbaum
IC Bus	United States	2002	Mathias Carlbaum
Volkswagen Truck & Bus	Brazil	1981	Roberto Cortes

== Subsidiaries and Services ==
=== Scania AB ===
Scania makes trucks for long-distance and distribution traffic, construction sites, and special areas, including autonomous trucks for enclosed areas. City and intercity buses, and coaches complete the product portfolio. In 2025, the brand sold 94,073 vehicles – 87,588 trucks and 6,485 buses.

=== MAN Truck & Bus SE ===
MAN has medium- and heavy-duty trucks for long-haul and distribution transport, as well as for construction sites and special applications. In addition to urban, intercity, and touring coaches of the MAN and Neoplan brands, the TGE light transporter completes the range of models on offer. In 2025, MAN sold 99,961 vehicles, including 63,296 trucks, 7,002 buses and 31,344 crafters. In 2025, sales revenue of the MAN Truck & Bus operating unit was 14.1 billion euros.

=== International Motors, LLC ===
International produces heavy trucks and engines under its namesake brand, as well as buses under the IC Bus brand. On 1 July 2021, International (at the time known as Navistar) became a wholly owned subsidiary of Traton SE, and therefore part of the Traton Group.

=== Volkswagen Truck & Bus Industria e Comercio de Veiculos Ltda ===
Volkswagen Truck & Bus specializes in developing markets. It has light-, medium-, and heavy-duty trucks for long-distance and distribution transport, construction sites, and special areas. City and intercity buses and coaches are also available. In 2025, it sold a total of 42,988 vehicles.

=== RIO ===
RIO (TB Digital Services GmbH) is the digital services brand of Traton.

=== Traton Financial Services AB ===
Traton Financial Services is Traton's captive finance business, providing financial and insurance products and other services under the following customer facing brands:

- Scania Financial Services
- MAN Financial Services
- International Financial
- Volkswagen Truck & Bus Financial Services

=== Traton Charging Solutions AB ===
Traton Charging Solutions offers access to a network of public charging locations for electric commercial vehicles across Europe.
