= DARPA Grand Challenge (2007) =

Third driverless car competition of the DARPA Grand Challenge

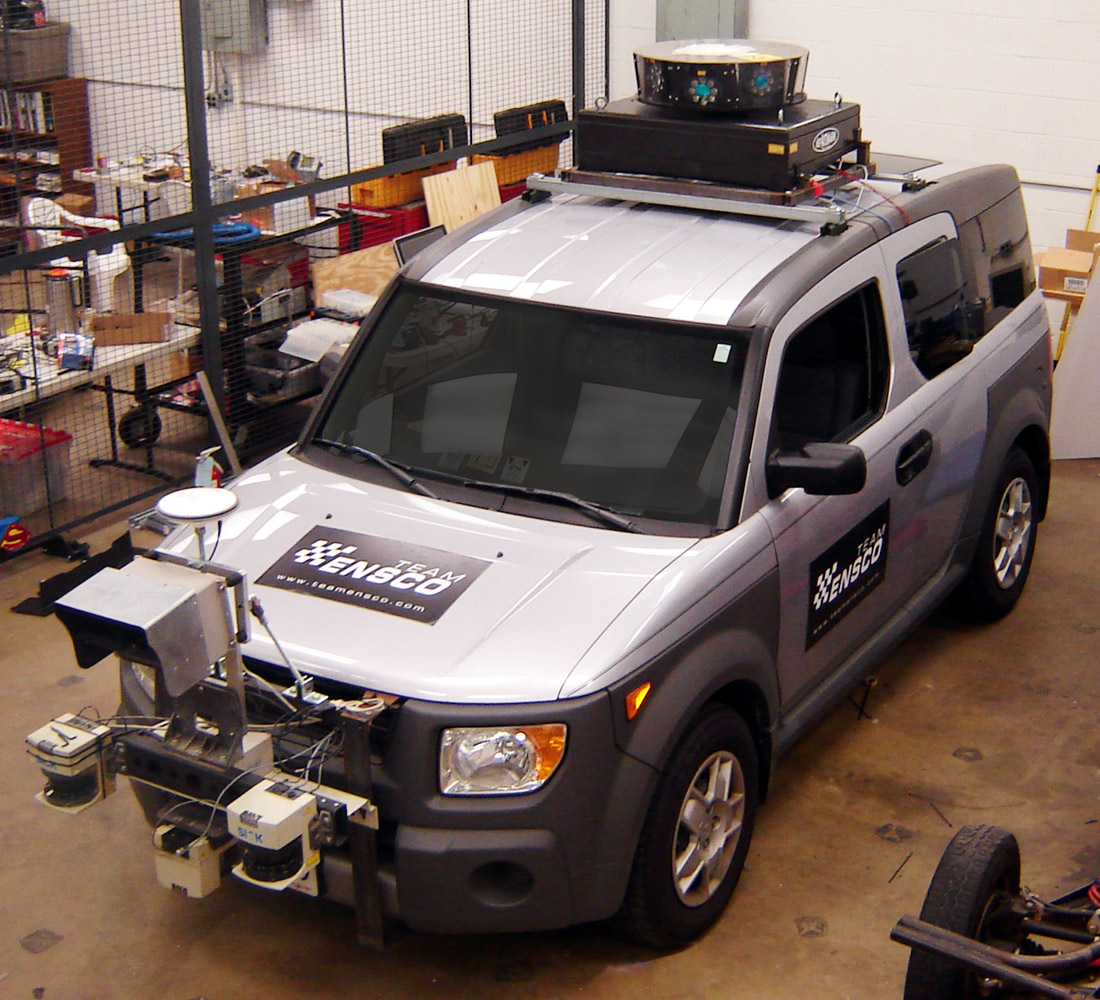
A vehicle being developed for the 2007 DARPA Urban Challenge

The third driverless car competition of the DARPA Grand Challenge was commonly known as the DARPA Urban Challenge. It took place on November 3, 2007 at the site of the now-closed George Air Force Base (currently used as Southern California Logistics Airport), in Victorville, California (Google map), in the West of the United States. Discovery's Science channel followed a few of the teams and covered the Urban Challenge in its Robocars series.

== Overview ==
The $2 million winner was Tartan Racing, a collaborative effort by Carnegie Mellon University and General Motors Corporation, with their vehicle "Boss", a heavily modified Chevrolet Tahoe. The second-place finisher earning the $1 million prize was the Stanford Racing Team with their entry "Junior", a 2006 Volkswagen Passat. Coming in third place was team Victor Tango from Virginia Tech winning the $500,000 prize with their 2005 Ford Escape hybrid, "Odin".

The course involved a 96 kilometres (60 mi) urban area course, to be completed in less than 6 hours. Rules included obeying all traffic regulations while negotiating with other traffic and obstacles and merging into traffic. While the 2004 and 2005 events were more physically challenging for the vehicles, the robots operated in isolation and did not encounter other vehicles on the course, the Urban Challenge required designers to build vehicles able to obey all traffic laws while they detect and avoid other vehicles on the course; other competing robots and human professional drivers occupied the course. This is a particular challenge for vehicle software, as vehicles must make "intelligent" decisions in real time based on the actions of other vehicles. Other than previous autonomous vehicle efforts that focused on structured situations such as highway driving with little interaction between the vehicles, this competition operated in a more cluttered urban environment and required the cars to perform sophisticated interactions with each other, such as maintaining precedence at a 4-way stop intersection.

The advantages of this technology are potentially enormous. Well-coordinated fully automatic driving will be much more efficient, with reduction in traffic jams and road accidents, which cost trillions per year in the US alone. Efficiency will also reduce energy consumption and thus pollution and climate change.

Unlike the past two challenges, DARPA announced that some teams were to receive development funding, based on proposals submitted to DARPA. Eleven teams could receive up to US$1 million a piece under this special program track (Track A). These 11 teams largely represent major universities and large corporate interests such as CMU teaming with GM, Stanford and Braunschweig University of Technology teaming with Volkswagen, Virginia Tech teaming with Torc Robotics, Oshkosh Truck, Honeywell, Raytheon, Caltech, Autonomous Solutions, Cornell, and MIT. One of the few independent entries in Track A was the Golem Group.

== Basic rules for 2007 ==
- Vehicle must be stock or have a documented safety record.
- Vehicle must obey the California state driving laws.
- Vehicle must be entirely autonomous, using only the information it detects with its sensors and public signals such as GPS.
- DARPA will provide the route network 24 hours before the race starts.
- Vehicles will complete the route by driving between specified checkpoints.
- DARPA will provide a file detailing the order the checkpoints must be driven to 5 minutes before the race start.
- Vehicles may “stop and stare” for at most 10 seconds.
- Vehicles must operate in rain and fog, with GPS blocked.
- Vehicles must avoid collision with vehicles and other objects such as carts, bicycles, traffic barrels, and objects in the environment such as utility poles.
- Vehicles must be able to operate in parking areas and perform U-turns as required by the situation.

== Initial site visits ==
In June/July 2007, 53 teams (see list below) were notified that they qualified for DARPA Site visits. Those teams that were successful in these evaluations moved on to a national qualifying event that took place in October 2007.

- Team 23 Racing
- A Bunch of Dropouts
- Team AnnieWay
- Austin Robot Technology
- Team Autonomous Solutions
- AvantGuardium
- Axion Racing
- The Ben Franklin Racing Team
- Berkeley-Sydney Driving Team
- Team Berlin
- BYUC
- Team CajunBot
- Team Caltech
- Team CarOLO
- Team CART
- Team Case
- Team Cornell
- Team Cybernet
- DOTMOBIL Team
- Gator Nation
- The Golem Group
- Team Gray
- Highlander Racing
- Insight Racing
- Intelligent Vehicle Systems
- Team Jefferson
- Team Juggernaut
- Team-LUX
- Martian Mentors
- Team MIT
- Mojavaton
- Team MEXICO
- TeamNOVA
- Ody-Era
- Team Orange
- Team Oshkosh
- OSU-ACT
- Pegasus
- Princeton University
- SciAutonics / Auburn Engineering
- Team Scorpion
- Stanford Racing Team
- Sting Racing
- Tartan Racing
- Trobo
- True Vision Robotics
- UBC Thunderbird Robotics
- Team UCF
- University of Utah
- Team Urbanator
- UU
- VictorTango

== Semi-finalists ==
On August 9, 2007, after completing the site visits, DARPA announced the 36 semi-finalists selected to participate in the Urban Challenge National Qualification Event (NQE) that took place October 26–31, 2007. Originally, the top 20 teams from that event were scheduled to proceed to the final competition on November 3, however only 11 teams were selected. The 36 semifinalists were:

- Austin Robot Technology - Austin, Texas
- AvantGuardium - Bethesda, Maryland
- Axion Racing - Westlake Village, California
- Ben Franklin Racing Team - Philadelphia, Pennsylvania
- Team CarOLO - New York, New York
- Gator Nation - Gainesville, Florida
- Golem Group - Santa Monica, California
- Insight Racing - Cary, North Carolina
- Intelligent Vehicle Systems - Dearborn, Michigan
- MIT - Cambridge, Massachusetts
- Mojavaton - Grand Junction, Colorado
- Ody-Era - Kokomo, Indiana
- OSU-ACT - Columbus, Ohio
- Princeton University - Princeton, New Jersey
- SciAutonics/Auburn Engineering - Thousand Oaks, California
- Stanford Racing Team - Stanford, California
- Sting Racing - Atlanta, Georgia
- Tartan Racing - Pittsburgh, Pennsylvania
- Team AnnieWay - Palo Alto, California
- Team Autonomous Solutions - Petersboro, Utah
- Team Berlin - Houston, Texas
- Team CajunBot - Lafayette, Louisiana
- Team Caltech - Pasadena, California
- Team Case - Cleveland, Ohio
- Team Cornell - Ithaca, New York
- Team Cybernet - Ann Arbor, Michigan
- Team Gray - Metairie, Louisiana
- Team Jefferson - Crozet, Virginia
- Team Juggernaut - Sandy, Utah
- Team-LUX - Woodstock, Maryland
- Team Oshkosh Truck - Oshkosh, Wisconsin
- Team UCF - Orlando, Florida
- Team Urbanator - Littleton, Colorado
- University of Utah - Salt Lake City, Utah
- UU - Westminster, Maryland
- VictorTango - Blacksburg, Virginia

== National Qualification Event ==
Diagram of qualification area A

The National Qualification Event for the 2007 challenge occurred between October 26 and 31, 2007. 35 teams were selected to participate in this semifinal round. The qualifying rounds included 3 areas: A, B, and C. Area A was a test of the robots' ability to merge. A 2-way loop of human traffic (provided by professional stunt drivers) surrounded a one-way road running from one side of the loop to the other. Robots had to go from the one-way road, make a left turn into traffic, follow the loop 180 degrees, and make another left turn onto the one-way road again. Robots were free to make as many laps as they could in the allotted time. Area B was mostly closed to spectators except for the start and finish, and involved the robots navigating a long suburban route demonstrating parking, navigation, and avoiding stalled cars along the way. Area B was part of the final event course. In Area C, robots performed several loops into two 4-way intersections in order to test their implementation of 4-way stops. Each loop, human drivers would provide a progressively more difficult intersection situation. At some points in Area C, roads would be blocked to test robots' ability to re-plan routes.

On November 1, 2007 it was announced that there would be only 11 teams competing in the Urban Challenge. The 11 teams selected to compete were the following:

1. AnnieWay
2. Ben Franklin
3. Team CarOLO
4. Cornell
5. Intelligent Vehicle Systems
6. MIT
7. Stanford Racing
8. Tartan Racing
9. Team Oshkosh
10. Team UCF
11. Victor Tango

DARPA's reasoning for only qualifying 11 teams was primarily safety-related. DARPA felt that since there would be real humans near the robots in the traffic cars as well as DARPA officials scoring robot performance, safety was paramount.

Teams were given sparsely defined waypoints charting the course for the robocars to follow. However, other teams generated a detailed map of the qualifications tracks. A debriefing published by one of the teams illustrated graphically the course it was given by DARPA contrasted against the course used by the winning team.

== Finals ==
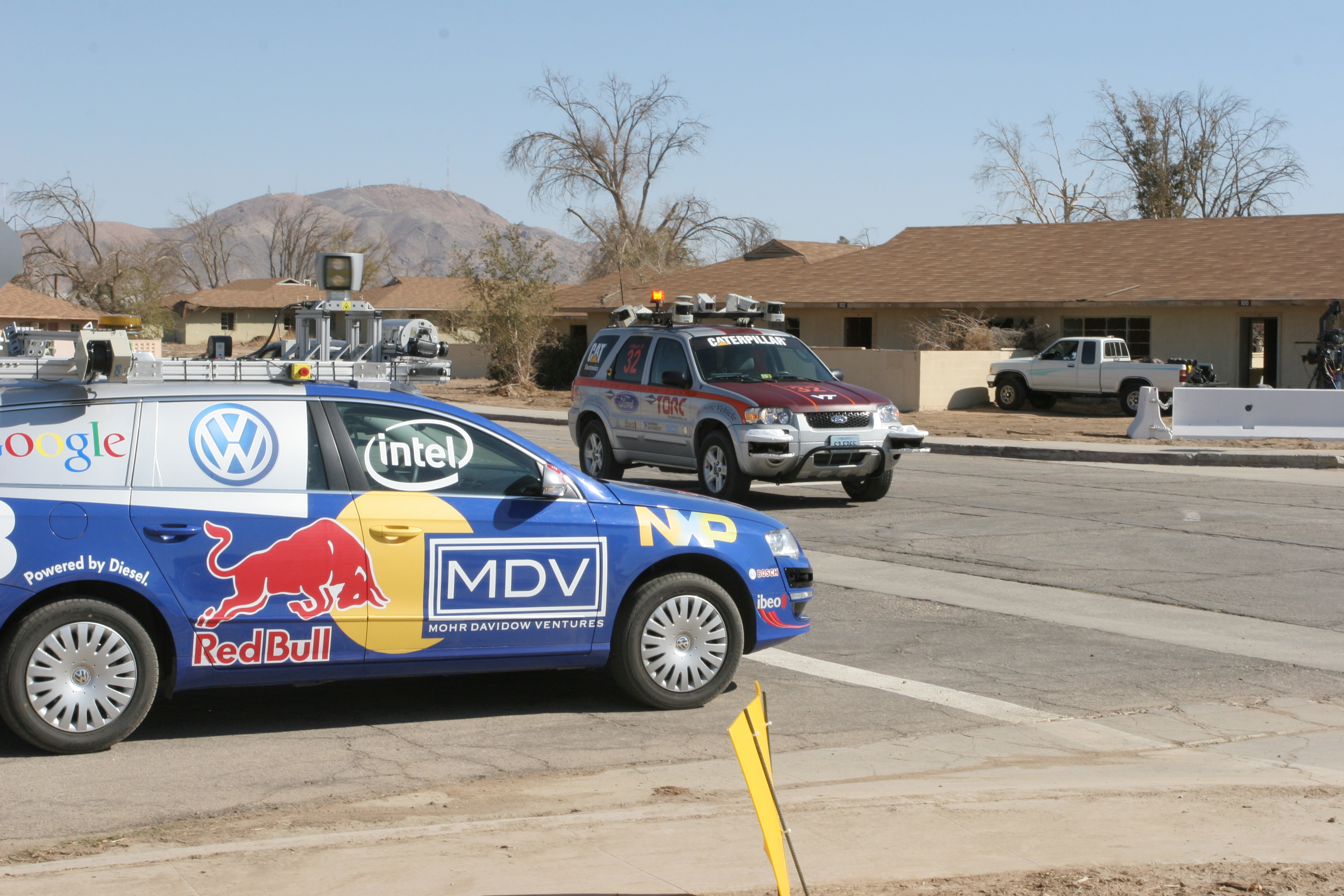
Stanford Racing and Victor Tango together at an intersection in the DARPA Urban Challenge Finals

Starting Area: 34.5846°N 117.369°W

The final event for the DARPA Urban Challenge took place on November 3, 2007, and included all 11 teams which made it past the semi-final National Qualification Event. The event was broadcast on a live webcast via the DARPA Urban Challenge website, narrated by Marty Reid (racing sportscaster) and Grant Imahara (of MythBusters acclaim), with "sideline reporting" by Jamie Hyneman (also of Mythbusters).

The final event consisted of three missions, approximately 55 miles (89 km) in total, given to each team. A team's score for each mission was computed by taking the total time taken to complete the mission, and adding and subtracting penalties and bonuses. Penalties were assessed for excessive delay, violating traffic rules, exhibiting dangerous behavior, etc. Vehicles were frequently manually paused for safety reasons; if a vehicle was not the root cause of such a pause then the duration of the pause was not counted in its final score. In order to officially complete the race, a vehicle's adjusted time for the three missions must be under six hours.

Six autonomous vehicle teams finished the event; Carnegie Mellon, Stanford, Virginia Tech, Ben Franklin Racing, MIT, and Cornell. On November 4, CMU's Boss was named the winner, followed by Stanford's Junior, then Virginia Tech's Odin, and MIT's Talos. Final adjusted scores for the six vehicles were not announced.

== Race participants and results ==
| Team Name | ID# | Track | Vehicle | Type | Team Location | Time Taken (h:m:s) | Result |
|---|---|---|---|---|---|---|---|
| Tartan Racing | 19 | A | Boss | 2007 Chevrolet Tahoe | Carnegie Mellon University, Pittsburgh, Pennsylvania | 4:10:20 | 1st Place; averaged approximately 14 miles per hour throughout the course |
| Stanford Racing | 03 | A | Junior | 2006 Volkswagen Passat Wagon | Stanford University, Palo Alto, California | 4:29:28 | 2nd Place; averaged about 13.7 miles per hour (22.0 km/h) throughout the course |
| VictorTango | 32 | A | Odin | 2005 Ford Hybrid Escape | Virginia Tech, Blacksburg, Virginia | 4:36:38 | 3rd Place; averaged slightly less than 13 miles per hour (21 km/h) throughout the course |
| MIT | 79 | A | Talos | Land Rover LR3 (2004–08) | MIT, Cambridge, Massachusetts | Approx. 6 hours | 4th Place. |
| The Ben Franklin Racing Team | 74 | B | Little Ben | 2006 Toyota Prius | University of Pennsylvania, Lehigh University, Philadelphia, Pennsylvania | Over 6 hour limit | One of 6 teams to finish course |
| Cornell | 26 | A | Skynet | 2007 Chevrolet Tahoe | Cornell University, Ithaca, New York | Over 6 hour limit | One of 6 teams to finish course |
| Team CarOLO | 62 | B | Caroline | 2006 Volkswagen Passat | Braunschweig, Germany | DNF | Eliminated fifth during mission one of the finals. Pulled after a collision head on in traffic circle, while turning right correctly but being damaged by the wrong way driving opponent. |
| Team UCF | 13 | B | Knight Rider | 1996 Subaru Outback Legacy 4WD | University of Central Florida, Orlando, Florida | DNF | Eliminated fourth during mission one. Vehicle vs building incident |
| Team Oshkosh | 21 | A | TerraMax | Marine Medium Tactical Vehicle Replacement (MTVR) | Oshkosh, Wisconsin | DNF | Eliminated third during mission one. Vehicle vs building incident |
| Honeywell/Intelligent Vehicle Systems | 15 | A | XAV-250 | Ford F-250 (2004–2008) | Troy, MI – Dearborn, MI – Minneapolis, MN | DNF | Eliminated first or second during mission one. Froze at intersection |
| AnnieWay | 54 | B | AnnieWAY | Passat Variant 2.0 FSI (2005–2008) | Karlsruhe, Germany | DNF | Eliminated first or second during mission one. Froze at entrance to traffic circle |
