= 2023 Canadian honours =

Canadian government recognitions

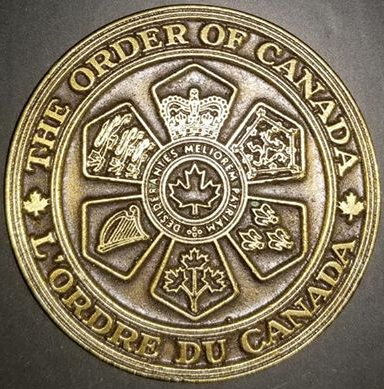
The Seal of the Order of Canada

The following are the appointments to various Canadian Honours of 2023. Usually, they are announced as part of the New Year and Canada Day celebrations and are published within the Canada Gazette during year. This follows the custom set out within the United Kingdom which publishes its appoints of various British Honours for New Year's and for monarch's official birthday. However, instead of the midyear appointments announced on Victoria Day, the official birthday of the Canadian Monarch, this custom has been transferred with the celebration of Canadian Confederation and the creation of the Order of Canada.

However, as the Canada Gazette publishes appointment to various orders, decorations and medal, either Canadian or from Commonwealth and foreign states, this article will reference all Canadians so honoured during the 2023 calendar year.

Provincial Honours are not listed within the Canada Gazette, however they are listed within the various publications of each provincial government. Provincial honours are listed within the page.

The first appointments to the Order of Canada were announced on December 29, 2022.

More appointments were announced on June 30, 2023.

== The Order of Canada ==
=== Companions of the Order of Canada ===
Undress ribbon of a Companion of the Order of Canada

- John Louis Bragg, C.C., O.N.S.
- Eugene Levy, C.C. (This is a promotion within the Order.)
- Alan Bernstein, C.C., O.Ont.
- Clément Gascon, C.C., K.C.
- Leo Gerard, C.C. (This is a promotion within the Order.)

=== Officer of the Order of Canada ===
Undress ribbon of an Officer of the Order of Canada

- Gordon John Glenn Asmundson, O.C., S.O.M.
- Lise Françoise Aubut, O.C.
- James Ashley Corcoran, O.C.
- Michel Côté, O.C., M.S.C.
- Sidney Patrick Crosby, O.C., O.N.S.
- Eleanor Joanne Daley, O.C.
- Ronald James Deibert, O.C., O.Ont.
- Allen Charles Edward Eaves, O.C., O.B.C.
- Robert Alan Ezrin, O.C.
- Victor Jay Garber, O.C.
- André Gaudreault, O.C.
- Paula Beth Gordon, O.C., O.B.C.
- Laurence A. Gray, O.C.
- Eva Grunfeld, O.C.
- Budd Lionel Hall, O.C.
- Michael Douglas Hill, O.C.
- Walter William Jule Jr., O.C.
- The Honourable Harry S. LaForme, O.C.
- Bernard Joseph Lapointe, O.C.
- Pierre Lassonde, O.C., G.O.Q. (This is a promotion within the Order.)
- Andreas Laupacis, O.C.
- Yves Lenoir, O.C.
- David Frederick Ley, O.C.
- Richard Caruthers Little, O.C.
- Gerald James Lozinski, O.C.
- Joan Mary Lozinski, O.C.
- Ivar Mendez, O.C.
- The Honourable Gerald M. Morin, O.C., K.C.
- Eli Rubenstein, O.C.
- David Saint-Jacques, O.C., O.Q.
- Brian Edward Stewart, O.C., O.Ont.
- Barbara Lewis Zimmerman, O.C.
- Johnny N. Adams, O.C., C.Q.
- lax̌lax̌tkʷ Jeannette Christine Armstrong, O.C.
- Kerry S. Courneya, O.C.
- Keith Stephen Dobson, O.C.
- Irwin Elman, O.C.
- Sheree Lynn Fitch, O.C.
- Haissam Haddad, O.C.
- Chief 7IDANsuu James Hart, O.C., O.B.C.
- James Igloliorte, O.C.
- Michael Norman George James, O.C.
- Andy Kim, O.C.
- Will Kymlicka, O.C.
- Marc Messier, O.C., M.S.C.
- Kent Monkman, O.C.
- Kathryn Moran, O.C.
- Joseph L. Pater, O.C.
- Bruce Poon Tip, O.C.
- Richard Keith Reznick, O.C.
- The Honourable Robert James Sharpe, O.C.
- Nigel Graham Shrive, O.C.
- Masai Michael Ujiri, O.C.
- Jeffrey Ian Weitz, O.C.

=== Members of the Order of Canada ===
Undress ribbon for a Member of the Order of Canada

- Jean Aitcheson, C.M.
- Shelley Diane Ambrose, C.M.
- Ted Barris, C.M.
- Marie-Dominique Beaulieu, C.M., C.Q.
- Stephen Alfred Bell, C.M., O.M.
- John J. M. Bergeron, C.M., C.Q.
- Kevin Luke Blackmore, C.M.
- Sheila Ruth Block, C.M.
- Bernard Joseph Bocquel, C.M.
- Louis André Borfiga, C.M.
- Yvonne Bonnie Bressette, C.M.
- André H. Caron, C.M.
- Timothy Allen Caulfield, C.M.
- The Honourable Maria Emma Chaput, C.M.
- Wayne Chaulk, C.M.
- Angela Ella Cooper Brathwaite, C.M., O.Ont.
- Alan Côté, C.M.
- Armand Calixte Doucet, C.M., M.S.M.
- Douglas Allen Dunsmore, C.M.
- Konrad Eisenbichler, C.M.
- Carolyn R. Freeman, C.M.
- Patricia Garel, C.M.
- Félix Gauthier, C.M.
- Samuel Gewurz, C.M.
- Hamlin Washington Grange, C.M.
- Allan Edward Gross, C.M., O.Ont.
- Feridun Hamdullahpur, C.M.
- Lori Haskell, C.M.
- Raymond John Johnson, C.M.
- Colleen Patricia Jones, C.M.
- Martin F. Katz, C.M.
- Simon Sean Keith, C.M.
- Warren Charles Seymour Kimel, C.M.
- Donald Arnold Kossick, C.M.
- Stéphane Laporte, C.M.
- Karina Chenelle LeBlanc, C.M.
- Philippe Lette, C.M.
- Frederick John Longstaffe, C.M.
- John Robert Lounds, C.M.
- Brian Gerald MacKay-Lyons, C.M.
- Conor Gerard Maguire, C.M.
- Michael Massey, C.M., A.O.E.
- Jacqueline Mary Elizabeth Maxwell, C.M., O.Ont.
- Marc Daniel Mayer, C.M.
- Heather Mary McGregor, C.M.
- Roderick McKendrick, C.M.
- Bill Howard Namagoose, C.M.
- Patricia Margaret Ningewance, C.M.
- Michèle Ouimet, C.M., C.Q.
- Pitman Benjamin Potter, C.M.
- Benoît Robert, C.M.
- Frantz Saintellemy, C.M.
- Raymond Saint-Pierre, C.M.
- Victor Sarin, C.M.
- Michael Schmidt, C.M.
- Gary S. Segal, C.M.
- Lorraine P. Segato, C.M.
- William George Sembo, C.M.
- Mark Geoffrey Sirett, C.M.
- Donat Taddeo, C.M.
- Laurier Thibault, C.M.
- Mac Van Wielingen, C.M.
- Stanley Vollant, C.M., C.Q., M.S.C.
- The Honourable Konrad Winrich Graf Finck von Finckenstein, C.M., K.C.
- Richard D. Weisel, C.M.
- Lydia Muriel Adams, C.M.
- Morag Barbara Arneil, C.M.
- Barbara Assiginaak, C.M., O.Ont.
- Savage Bear, C.M.
- John William Beaucage, C.M.
- Normand Caissie, C.M., O.N.B.
- Sarah Alexandra Carter, C.M.
- Elder Harley Kim Crowshoe, C.M.
- Rola Dagher, C.M.
- Wendy Ruth Eisen, C.M.
- Jayanne English, C.M.
- John Fleetham, C.M.
- Robert J. Foster, C.M.
- Thomas Fredric Garfat, C.M.
- Joan Heather Garson, C.M.
- Paul Joseph Gauthier, C.M.
- Ronald Gold, C.M.
- Gary Daniel Goldberg, C.M.
- Charles William Gordon, C.M.
- Mathilde Françoise Gravelle-Bazinet, C.M.
- Rhoda E. Howard-Hassmann, C.M.
- Terry Hunter, C.M.
- A. Leona Irons-Cummings, C.M.
- G. Lynn Jones, C.M.
- Richard Jean L’Abbé, C.M.
- Richard B. Larson, C.M.
- John Anthony Lederer, C.M.
- Beverly Janet Lemire, C.M.
- Daniel Levy, C.M.
- Donald Alexander MacPherson, C.M.
- Jean Eleanor Marmoreo, C.M.
- Don McDougall, C.M.
- Holly Susan McNally, C.M.
- Paul McNally, C.M.
- Robert Michaud, C.M.
- Robert Edward Mitchell, C.M.
- Peter R. O’Brien, C.M.
- Grant Norval Pierce, C.M., O.M.
- Léo-Paul Pinet, C.M., O.N.B.
- Evan Price, C.M.
- Gary Rush Purdy, C.M.
- Jeff Reading, C.M.
- Mike H. Shaikh, C.M.
- Ann Martin Shaw, C.M.
- Peter Showler, C.M.
- Santee Smith Tekaronhiáhkhwa, C.M.
- Stephen Stohn, C.M.
- Susan Swan, C.M.
- Norman Kiyomitsu Takeuchi, C.M.
- Sally Elizabeth Thorne, C.M.
- Mary A. Tidlund, C.M.
- Gérard Trudeau, C.M.
- Carole Vivier, C.M., O.M.
- Keith R. Walley, C.M.
- Savannah Tennessee Elaine Walling, C.M.
- Clifford A. Wallis, C.M.
- Daniel Marc Weinstock, C.M.
- Samuel Weiss, C.M.
- Thomas Cunningham Wilson, C.M.
- Michael Wulder, C.M.

== Order of Military Merit ==
=== Extraordinary Commander of the Order of Military Merit ===
Undress ribbon for a Commander of the Order of Military Merit

- Her Royal Highness The Princess Anne, Princess Royal, KG, KT, GCVO, GCStJ, QSO, GCL, CMM, CD

== Order of Merit of the Police Forces ==
=== Commander of the Order of Merit of the Police Forces ===
Undress ribbon of a Commander of the Order of Merit of the Police Forces

- Commissioner Thomas W. B. Carrique, C.O.M. (This is a promotion within the Order).
- Deputy Director Jacques Duchesneau, C.M., C.O.M., C.Q. (This is a promotion within the Order).
- Commissioner Michael Robert Duheme, C.O.M.

=== Officers of the Order of Merit of the Police Forces ===
Undress ribbon of an Officer of the Order of Merit of the Police Forces

- Staff Superintendent Peter Code, O.O.M.
- Chief Gary G. Conn, O.O.M. (This is a promotion within the Order).
- Deputy Chief Troy Cooper, O.O.M. (This is a promotion within the Order).
- Deputy Commissioner Charles E. J. Cox, O.O.M. (This is a promotion within the Order).
- Deputy Commissioner Roseanne DiMarco, O.O.M. (This is a promotion within the Order).
- Assistant Commissioner Brian Francis Edwards, O.O.M. (This is a promotion within the Order).
- Ronald Kyle Friesen, O.O.M.
- Chief Superintendent Shawn Gill, O.O.M. (This is a promotion within the Order).
- Deputy Commissioner Christopher Wiliam Harkins, O.O.M. (This is a promotion within the Order).
- Chief Superintendent Steven Herbert Ing, O.O.M. (This is a promotion within the Order).
- Deputy Commissioner Kenneth Dwayne McDonald, O.O.M. (This is a promotion within the Order).
- Chief Ronald David Morrison, O.M.M.
- Chief Danny Smyth, O.M.M.

=== Members of the Order of Merit of the Police Forces ===
Undress ribbon of a Member of the Order of Merit of the Police Forces

- Chief Graham John Abela, M.O.M.
- Inspector Leah Barber, M.O.M.
- Staff Superintendent Mark Barkley, M.O.M.
- Inspector Rene Beauchemin, M.O.M.
- Deputy Chief Steve Bell, M.O.M.
- Chief Francis David Bergen, M.O.M.
- Inspector Trevor Burmachuk, M.O.M.
- Sergeant Blair Canning, M.O.M.
- Staff Superintendent Randolph M. Carter, M.O.M.
- Superintendent Gordon Frederick Corbett, M.O.M.
- Superintendent Marie-Claude Côté, M.O.M.
- Deputy Chief Paulo Da Silva, M.O.M.
- Chief Constable Dean Stuart Duthie, M.O.M.
- Chief Paul Fiander, M.O.M.
- Chief Superintendent Darcy Paul Fleury, M.O.M.
- Inspector Jesse Eric Gilbert, M.O.M.
- Chief Superintendent Gary Stephen Graham, M.O.M.
- Director General Christine Greeno, M.O.M.
- Sergeant Giovanni John Grillone, M.O.M.
- Deputy Chief Cecile Hammond, M.O.M.
- Deputy Chief Jeffrey Haskins, M.O.M.
- Deputy Chief Jeff Hill, M.O.M.
- Inspector Adam Illman, M.O.M.
- Sergeant Robert Kent Jamieson, M.O.M.
- Staff Superintendent Robert E. Johnson, M.O.M.
- Constable Robert E. Kavanaugh, M.O.M.
- Sergeant Maria Keen, M.O.M.
- Chief Superintendent Kevin R. H. Kunetzki, M.O.M.
- Deputy Chief Constable Jason Laidman, M.O.M.
- Superintendent Phillip A. Lue, M.O.M.
- Chief Superintendent Bryan J. MacKillop, M.O.M.
- Superintendent Tina D. Maier, M.O.M.
- Superintendent Gary Warren Maracle, M.O.M.
- Senior Constable Shawn M. McCurdy, M.O.M.
- Sergeant Ronda Lynn McEwen, M.O.M.
- Superintendent David Meade, M.O.M.
- Superintendent Peter Moreira, M.O.M.
- Inspector Donald Richard Moser, M.O.M.
- Detective Inspector Daniel Nadeau, M.O.M.
- Superintendent Dawn Tracy Orr, M.O.M.
- Superintendent Gurmakh (Bill) Parmar, M.O.M.
- Superintendent Kerry Petryshyn, M.O.M.
- Acting Deputy Chief Lauren Pogue, M.O.M.
- Superintendent Todd Preston, M.O.M.
- Danielle J. Rajah, M.O.M.
- Inspector Tricia Rupert, M.O.M.
- Staff Sergeant Carl Sesely, M.O.M.
- Chief Superintendent Scott Osbourne Sheppard, M.O.M.
- Superintendent Tyrone Sideroff, M.O.M.
- Sergeant Eyjolfur S. Smith, M.O.M.
- Staff Sergeant Shayne Smith, M.O.M.
- Staff Sergeant David Strachan, M.O.M.
- Director Denis Turcotte, M.O.M.
- Constable Annemarie A. Unheim, M.O.M.
- Corporal Neil Vaid, M.O.M.
- Director Tony Ventura, M.O.M.
- Inspector Thomas W. Warfield, M.O.M.
- Inspector Wendy Weist, M.O.M.
- Constable Jennifer White, M.O.M.
- Inspector Joel Derrick Whittaker, M.O.M.
- Staff Sergeant Mark R. Wielgosz, M.O.M.
- Detective Christina Witt, M.O.M.
- Detective Andy Woodward, M.O.M.

== Royal Victorian Order ==
Undress ribbon for all grades of the Royal Victorian Order

=== Member of the Royal Victorian Order ===
- Cathy Lynne Bursey-Sabourin, MVO, Fraser Herald and Principal Artist, Canadian Heraldic Authority

== Most Venerable Order of the Hospital of St. John of Jerusalem ==
Undress ribbon for all grades of the Most Venerable Order of the Hospital of St. John of Jerusalem

=== Knights and Dames of the Order of St. John ===
- Her Honour the Honourable Anita Neville, P.C., O.M.
- Chief Warrant Officer Marc Joseph Luc Boucher, M.M.M., C.D.
- Sergeant Adam James Dickinson Carter
- Honorary Lieutenant-Colonel John Buckingham Newman, M.S.M., C.D.
- Joseph Bruce Varner

=== Commanders of the Order of St. John ===
- Beverly Eileen Lafortune
- John Michael Prno
- Major Raymond David Valentine, C.D., AdeC (Retired)
- Andrew Preston Wilder, M.O.M.

=== Officers of the Order of St. John ===
- Dominic Benoît
- William Thomas Cahill
- Hélène Caron
- Darlene Chalmers
- Raymond M. Chow
- Lieutenant Colonel Stanley Anthony Fidele Grabstas, O.M.M., C.D. (Retired)
- Joanne Claire Green
- Glenda Mary Janes
- Mary Georgette Loblaw
- Shawn Ian McLaren
- Jeff Kwong Yuen Mok
- Marc-Antoine Pigeon
- Richard Stewart
- Peter Alan Thompson

=== Members of the Order of St. John ===
- Dillon Lee Wade Abbott
- Farhang Ahadzadeh
- Donald Scott Brown
- Major-General Paul James Bury, O.M.M., C.D. (Retired)
- Lieutenant-Colonel Donald James Denne (Retired)
- Master Warrant Officer Yvon Leger Eric Filion, C.D.
- Sebastien Gendron
- Major Stéphane Girard, C.D.
- Kenneth Brian Hansen
- Benjamin R. Holden
- Edna Ruth Knight
- Gabriella Tracey Kwan
- Dany Labonté
- Guy Langlois
- Sergeant Seth William Ambeau Laroche
- Stephen Andrew Latham
- Daniel J. Levinter
- Richard Nien-Chu Liu
- Philippe Florent Maurice Lurol
- Aaron Rey Yu Ma
- Albert Suo Yu Ma
- Lori McGeary
- Gary Scott McPherson
- Grace Anne Mehlenbacher
- Philippe Charles Morin
- Trong Danh Nguyen
- Stephanie Elizabeth Pilkey
- Lieutenant Maria Johanna Potter
- Shane Ryan Potter
- Hector Leandro Silva Mateus
- Mark Alan Saxston
- Anna Smith
- Gwendolyn Patricia Stoeber
- Kenneth John Swain
- Edward Tain
- Glyn Trafford
- Ryan Vickery
- James Leon Vigna
- Brenda Marie Waldie
- Matthew Luton Walter
- Ann Marie Watson

== Provincial Honours ==
=== National Order of Québec ===
==== Grand Officers of the National Order of Québec ====
Undress ribbon for a Grand Officer of the National Order of Québec

- Janette Bertrand (promotion)
- Armand Vaillancourt (promotion)

==== Officers of the National Order of Québec ====
Undress ribbon for an Officer of the National Order of Québec

- Gordon Bain
- Richard Béliveau
- Clément Demers
- Suzanne Fortier
- Linda Gaboriau
- Morris Goodman
- Diane Juster
- Georges Leroux
- Christiane Rousseau
- Guy Saint-Jacques

==== Knight of the National Order of Québec ====
Undress ribbon for a Knight of the National Order of Québec

- Brigitte Alepin
- Jean-François Archambault
- Howard Bergman
- Denis Brott
- Édith Butler
- Michel Côté, OC, CSM
- Charles-Philippe David
- Louise Déry
- Denise Desautels
- Jérôme Dupras
- Nassib El-Husseini
- Sandrine Faust
- Geneviève Fortier
- Patsy Gallant
- Daniel Granger
- Louise Jobin
- Gilbert Laporte
- Alexandre McKenzie
- Caroline Ouellette
- Michel Rabagliati
- Federico Rosei
- Guylaine Tremblay

=== Saskatchewan Order of Merit ===
- Al Anderson
- Nora Cummings
- Neal Herbert Hardy
- Pierre Hucl
- Don Meikle
- Jacqueline Tisher

=== Order of Ontario ===
- Jay Aspin
- John M. Beck
- Jo-Anne Clarke
- Hon. David Collenette
- Claire Crooks
- Julie Di Lorenzo
- John English
- Lee Errett
- Gervan Fearon
- Patrick Foran
- Blake C. Goldring
- Herbert Ho Ping Kong
- Blake Hutcheson
- Michael Latner
- Bernard Leduc
- Joy MacDermid
- Dwayne Morgan
- Florence Ngenzebuhoro
- Hazelle Palmer
- Fred Possmayer
- Peter Simon
- Gary Slaight
- George Trusler
- Raquel Urtasun
- Bhavana Varma

=== Order of British Columbia ===
- Dr. Penny Ballem
- Evanna Brennan
- Dr. Jane Buxton
- Dr. Pieter Cullis, OC, FRS
- Sam L. Feldman
- Gordon J. Fyfe
- Susan Giles
- Byng Giraud
- Chief Harold Leighton
- Susan I. Paish
- George C. Reifel
- Ryan Reynolds
- Daljit Thind
- Patricia Woroch

=== Alberta Order of Excellence ===
- James Carter, OC
- Dr. Max Foran
- Rt. Hon. Stephen Harper, PC, CC
- Joe Lukacs
- Audrey McFarlane
- Hon. Claudette Tardif
- Stella Thompson
- James Angus Watt

=== Order of Prince Edward Island ===
- Sister Teresa Currie
- Mary Hughes
- Scott Parsons

=== Order of Manitoba ===
- Jamie Brown
- David "Ace" Burpee
- John Einarson
- Charles Huband
- Hon. Janis Johnson, CM
- Terumi Kuwada
- Dr. Lorrie Kirshenbaum
- Dr. Gerry Price
- Alvina Rundle
- Dr. Richard Smith
- Elaine Stevenson
- Amarjeet Warraich

=== Order of New Brunswick ===
- Catherine Akagi
- Bud Bird, PC, OC
- Isabelle McKee-Allain
- Joanne E. McLeod, KC, CM
- Bernard Poirier, CM

=== Order of Nova Scotia ===
- Phil Comeau, CM, ONB
- Dr. Jacqueline Gahagan
- Bruce Guthro
- Prof. Sylvia D. Hamilton
- Stephen Kimber

=== Order of Newfoundland and Labrador ===
- David Elms
- Noreen Golfman
- Kevin Noel Melvin
- Rick Mercer, OC
- Patrick Parfrey
- Jean Claude Roy
- Andrus Voitk

== Territorial Honours ==
=== Order of Nunavut ===
2023 recipients of the Order of Nunavut have not been announced.

=== Order of the Northwest Territories ===
- Helen Balanoff
- Rick Hardy
- Maya Teya

=== Order of Yukon ===
- Yann Herry
- Tim Koepke
- David Stockdale
