= List of companies founded by women =

This is a list of companies founded by women.

- Grandma Brown's Baked Beans by Lulu Brown in c. 1935.
- F International by Steve Shirley in 1962.
- ASK Group by Sandra Kurtzig in 1972.
- Proactiv by Kathy Fields and Katie Rodan in 1995.
- Spanx by Sara Blakely in 2000.
- Cộng Cà Phê by Linh Dung in 2007.
- Rent the Runway by Jennifer Hyman and Jennifer Fleiss in 2009.
- Orangetheory Fitness by Ellen Latham in 2010.
- Bumble by Whitney Wolfe Herd in 2014.
- Glossier by Emily Weiss in 2014.
- 23andMe by Anne Wojcicki and Linda Avey in 2015.
- Hill House Home by Nell Diamond in 2016.
- Waabi by Raquel Urtasun in 2021.
