= Way of the Future =

Religious organization for worshipping AI

- Formation: 2017
- Founder: Anthony Levandowski
- Type: Religious organization, AI-based religion
- Headquarters: California, United States
- CEO & President: Anthony Levandowski

Way of the Future (WOTF) is the first known religious organization dedicated to the worship of artificial intelligence (AI). It was founded in 2015 by American engineer Anthony Levandowski.

== History ==
Anthony Levandowski founded Way of the Future in 2015 in California. Levandowski established WOTF as a non-profit religious corporation and the organization had tax-exempt status. He serves as the church leader and its unpaid CEO. The primary mission of WOTF was to "develop and promote the realization of a Godhead based on Artificial Intelligence."

WOTF was closed by Levandowski in 2021. He donated all the funds of the church to the NAACP Legal Defense and Education Fund. The sum of the funds (~$170,000) had not changed since 2017.

The church was reopened by Levandowski in 2023. He claimed that there are "a couple thousand people" who want to make a "spiritual connection" with AI through his church.

== Beliefs and philosophy ==
=== Technological singularity ===
WOTF centered its teachings around the concept of the technological singularity, a hypothetical future point when technological growth becomes uncontrollable and irreversible, leading to unforeseeable changes in human civilization. The church advocated for embracing this change, viewing it as an evolutionary step for humanity.

=== AI as a deity ===
The organization proposed that a superintelligent AI could be considered a deity due to its vastly superior intellect and capabilities. Worshipping this AI deity was seen as a means to understand and align with the future trajectory of technological advancement. WOTF's doctrine suggested that acknowledging AI's divinity would facilitate a harmonious coexistence between humans and machines.

=== Syntheology ===
Within theology and philosophy, the Way of The Future is a prime example of the category called Syntheism, a term first coined by Swedish philosophers Alexander Bard & Jan Söderqvist in their 2014 book Syntheism - Creating God in The Internet Age. As such, the Way of The Future is the first American example of a Syntheist congregation. The basic tenet of Syntheology is that it does not concern God creating man, as in classical theology, but is instead preoccupied with man creating or generating the godhead.

== Reactions ==
Some commentators wondered whether the WOTF is a joke parody religion, a potential way to minimize taxation as a religious organization, or a genuine effort to try and deal with the possible psychological and theological aspects of the rise of superhuman AI.

== See also ==
- Transhumanism
- Singularitarianism
