= PSR J0002+6216 =

Fast-moving pulsar in the constellation Cassiopeia

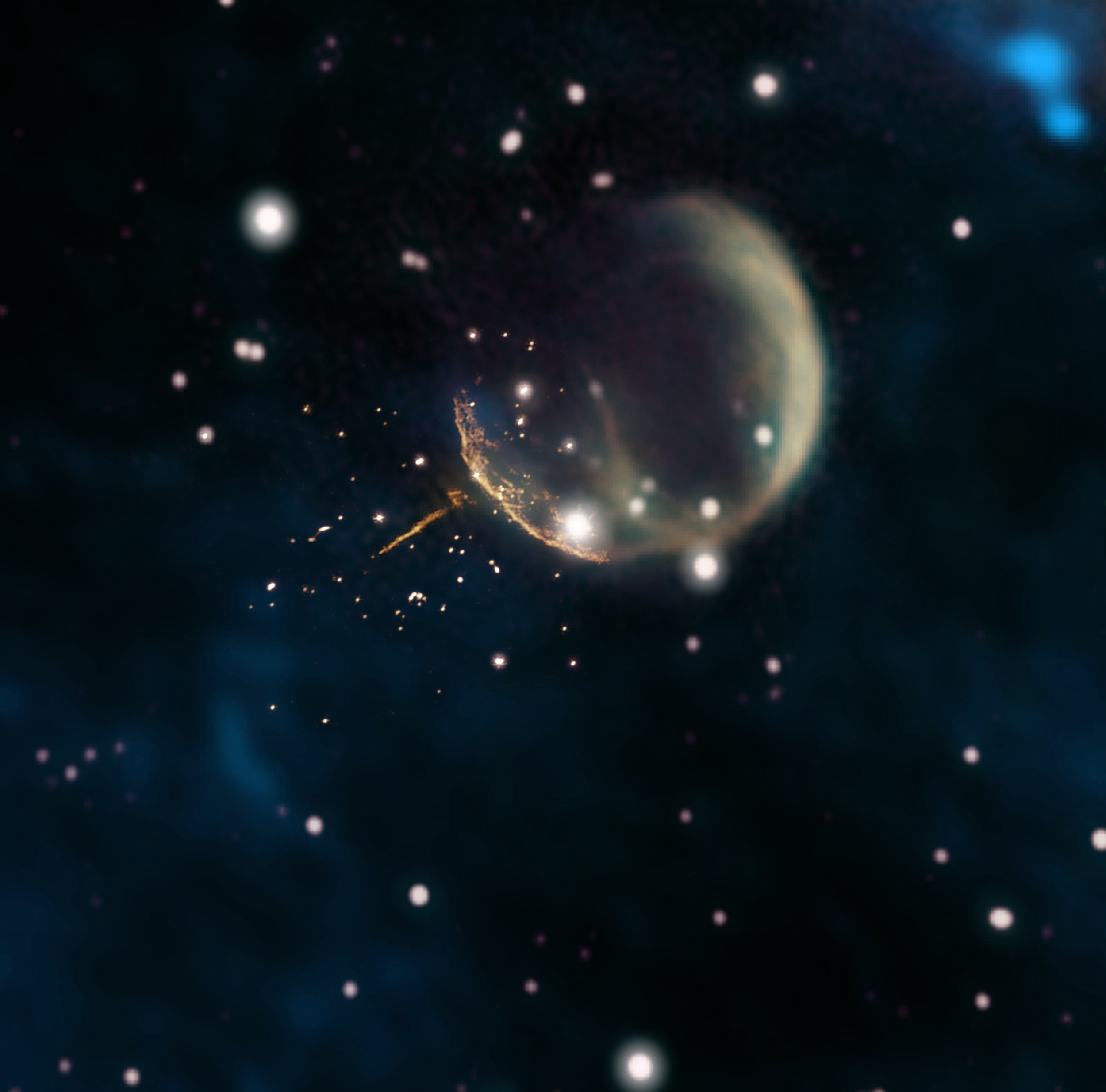
- Pulsar moving away from its Supernova Remnant, while leaving a trail made up of the interstellar medium Credit: Composite by Jayanne English, University of Manitoba; F. Schinzel et al.; NRAO/AUI/NSF; DRAO/Canadian Galactic Plane Survey; and NASA/IRAS. [CC BY 3.0]

Observation data Epoch J2000.0 Equinox J2000.0
- Constellation: Cassiopeia
- Right ascension: 00^{h} 02^{m} 58.17^{s}
- Declination: +62° 16′ 09.4″

Astrometry
| Total velocity | 1,127 km/s |
| Proper motion (μ) | RA: 32.52 mas/yr Dec.: -13.71 mas/yr |
| Parallax (π) | 0.63 mas |
| Distance | 6,500 ly (2,000 pc) |

Characteristics
- Spectral type: Pulsar

Details
| Rotation | 0.1153635682680 s |
| Age | 306,000 years |

Database references
| SIMBAD | data |

PSR J0002+6216, also dubbed the Cannonball Pulsar, is a pulsar discovered by the Einstein@Home project in 2017. It is one of the fastest moving pulsars known, and has moved 53 ly (5.0×10^{14} km; 3.1×10^{14} mi) away from the location of its formation supernova, where the remaining supernova nebula, CTB 1 (Abell 85), is. Due to its speed in traversing the interstellar medium, at 1,127 km/s (700 mi/s), it is leaving a 13 ly (1.2×10^{14} km; 7.6×10^{13} mi) long wake tail and is traveling fast enough to leave the Milky Way galaxy. The pulsar is currently 6,500 ly (6.1×10^{16} km; 3.8×10^{16} mi) away in the constellation Cassiopeia. The star rotates at a rate of 8.6682 times a second. There is bow-shock pulsar wind nebula (PWN) associated with PSR J0002+6216.
