= 神道 =

神道 can refer to:

- Shinto
- Shendao or Chinese folk religion
- Sacred way a footpath leading to a Chinese tomb
- Shendao shejiao, a Chinese philosophical perspective on religion
