= CTB 1 =

Large supernova remnant in the constellation Cassiopeia

Supernova remnant CTB 1
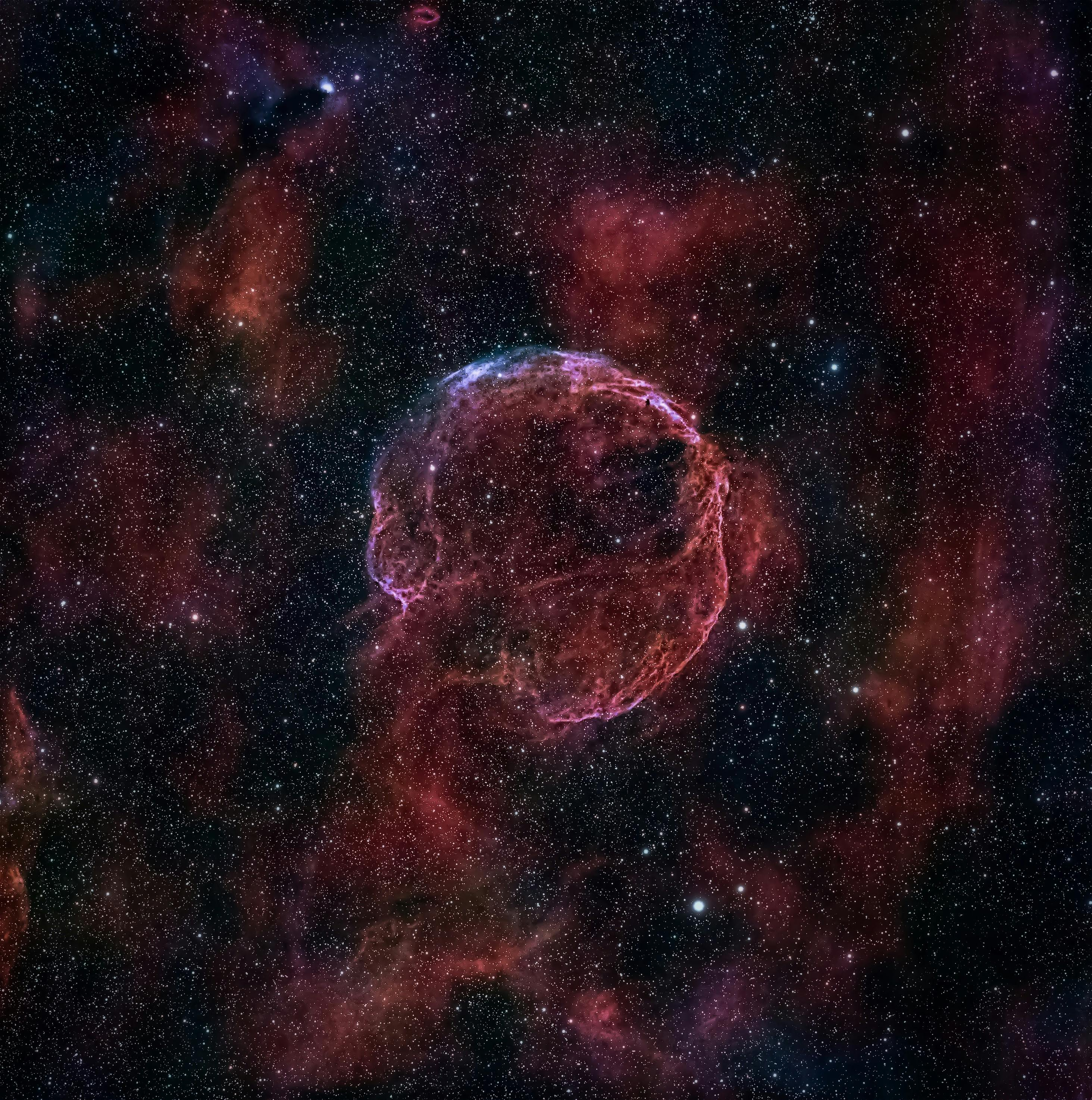
- Event type: Supernova remnant
- Type II (?)
- Constellation: Cassiopeia
- Right ascension: 23^{h} 59^{m} 13^{s}
- Declination: 62°26′
- Epoch: J2000
- Galactic coordinates: G116.93−00.17
- Distance: ~4,300 parsecs
- Remnant: PSR J0002+6216
- Progenitor: 13 - 15 M☉
- Notable features: Interaction with a molecular cloud
- Related media on Commons

CTB 1, also known as G116.9+00.1 and AJG 110, nicknamed the Medulla Nebula, is a supernova remnant located in the constellation Cassiopeia. It was discovered as a radio source in 1960 in a study of galactic radiation carried out at a frequency of 960 MHz.

== Morphology ==
CTB 1 is an oxygen-rich supernova remnant of mixed morphology, that is, in the radio band it is similar to a hollow shell while in X-rays its structure is compact and centralized. Thus, it shows a complete envelope in both the visible spectrum and the radio band. The radio emission is brightest along the western edge, with a prominent gap existing along the northern and northeastern sectors. The uniform envelope—in both wavelength ranges—indicates that the shock wave extends in a relatively homogeneous interstellar medium.

Infrared emission has also been detected at 60 μm and 100 μm from CTB 1; an arc of emission at these wavelengths is coincident with the shell observed at radio frequencies.

The X-ray emission from this supernova remnant – which has a thermal origin – comes from inside the shell, observed in the visible and radio spectrum. Notably, the X-ray emission also extends across the remnant's northern gap. The abundance of neon has been determined to be very uniform, while iron is more abundant towards the southwest of the remnant, suggesting that the distribution of ejecta is asymmetric. CTB 1 is a supernova remnant rich in oxygen and neon, which is surprising for an evolved remnant; The determined abundances are consistent with the explosion of a stellar progenitor with a mass of 13 - 15 solar masses or even greater.

== Stellar remnant ==
The pulsar PSR J0002+6216 has been proposed to be the stellar remnant of the supernova that caused the formation of CTB 1. Its proper motion is of the correct magnitude and direction to support the relationship between the two objects. Likewise, the direction and morphology of the plerion tail suggests a physical connection between PSR J0002+6216 and CTB 1. The pulsar is moving at high speed (more than 1000 km/s), which may be the result of the primary explosion.

== Age and distance ==
The estimated age of CTB 1 is 10,000 years, although the uncertainty of this value can be as high as 20%. Other studies give it a greater age, around 16,700 years. On the other hand, there is also no consensus regarding the distance at which this supernova remnant is located. Various publications place it at a distance between 2,000 and 3,100 parsecs, while for others it is at 4,300 ± 200 parsecs. If this last value is correct, CTB 1 would be located in the Perseus arm and not in the Local arm. CTB 1 has a radius of approximately 15 parsecs or 49 light years.

== See also ==
- List of supernova remnants
- Cassiopeia A
