= Ottomotto =

Former American self-driving technology company

Ottomotto LLC
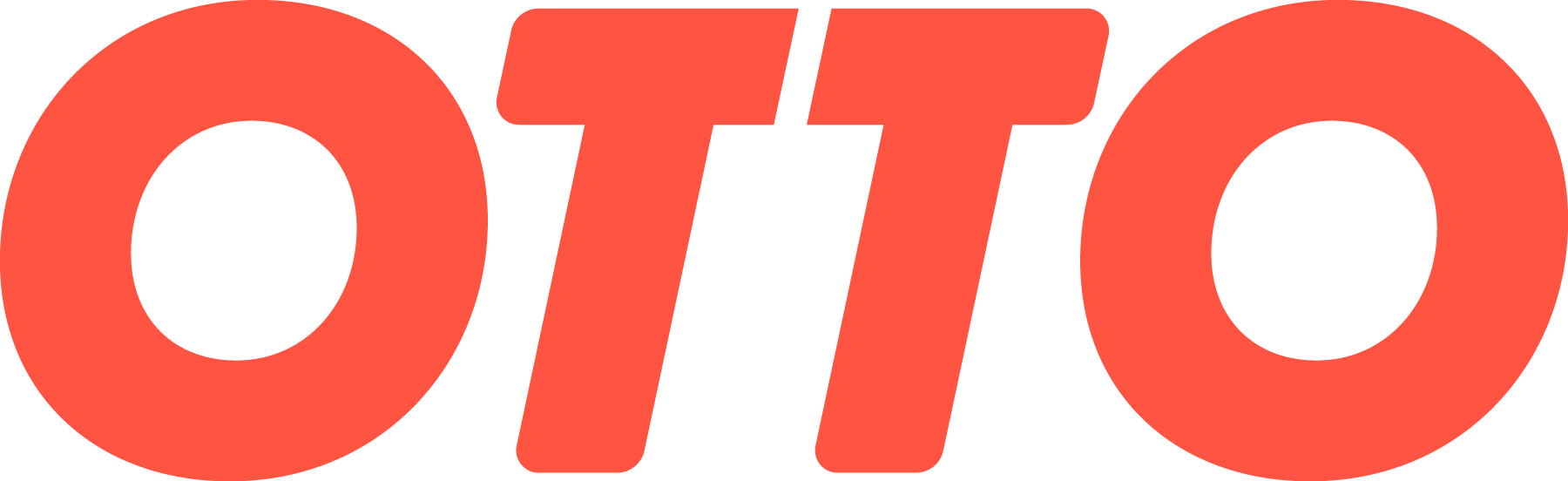
- Company type: Subsidiary
- Industry: Automotive, technology
- Founded: January 2016
- Founders: Anthony Levandowski; Lior Ron; Claire Delaunay; Don Burnette
- Defunct: 2018
- Fate: Defunct
- Headquarters: 737 Harrison, San Francisco, California, U.S.
- Products: Self-driving kit for long-haul trucks
- Parent: Uber
- Website: ot.to

Ottomotto LLC, d/b/a Otto, was an American self-driving technology company founded in January 2016 by Lior Ron and Anthony Levandowski.

The company was based in San Francisco and employed 90 people as of August 2016. The company focused on retrofitting semi trucks with radars, cameras and laser sensors to make them capable of driving themselves. In August 2016, Otto was acquired by Uber. Lior Ron, the co-founder of the company, had stated that Otto would have self-driving fleets of trucks on the road by early 2017, which, before the company ceased, never materialized.

== History ==
Otto was established in January 2016, and was one of a new generation of automobile firms venturing into making self-driving vehicles. The company was founded by Anthony Levandowski, who worked on the Google self-driving car project, and Lior Ron, who was a product lead on the Google Maps team. Claire Delaunay, who led the software development and Don Burnette, from Google’s self-driving car team were also co-founders. The team in August 2016 comprised 90 employees, with engineers from Google, Apple Inc., Tesla, Logitech, Stanford University and elsewhere. The firm’s base was a garage in the South of Market neighborhood of San Francisco.

As of August 2016, Otto had converted five Volvo 780 semis with self-driving technology and was testing them on interstate highways.

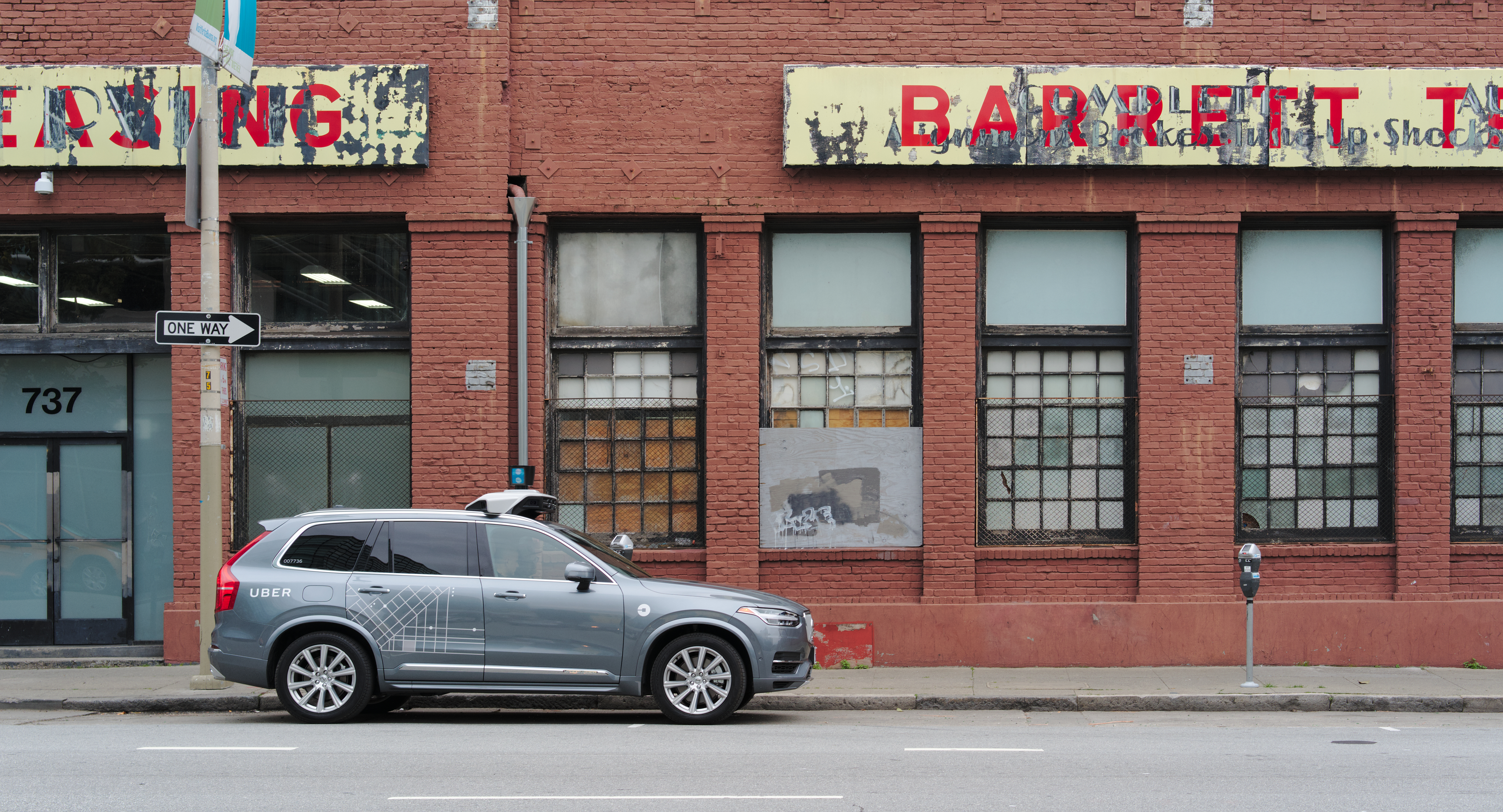
Uber self-driving Volvo XC90 parked outside the Otto headquarters

In August 2016, Otto was acquired by Uber at an estimated valuation of $680 million. Otto was to stay independent from Uber, according to Lior Ron. Anthony Levandowski would continue heading up Otto, as well as being in charge of Uber's self-driving division.

In October 2016 an Otto truck achieved the longest continuous journey by a driverless and autonomous semi-truck. It was a 132-mile route from Colorado Springs to Fort Collins in Colorado, USA. The truck traveled autonomously without a lead vehicle, teleoperation, or any other human intervention.

In February 2017, Waymo, a subsidiary of Alphabet Inc., filed a lawsuit against Uber, alleging that Anthony Levandowski "downloaded 9.7 GB of Waymo’s highly confidential files and trade secrets, including blueprints, design files and testing documentation" before resigning to found Otto. In March 2017, United States District Judge William Alsup, referred the case to federal prosecutors after Levandowski exercised his Fifth Amendment right against self-incrimination. In May 2017, Judge Alsup ordered Levandowski to refrain from working on Otto's Lidar and required Uber to disclose its discussions on the technology.

Clearpath Robotics filed a complaint in the Northern District of California on August 24, 2016 against Ottomotto LLC with respect to its OTTO brand. The action was dismissed with prejudice on February 1, 2017. Clearpath Robotics continues to operate the OTTO brand. In response, Clearpath issued a statement about the confusion. In May 2017, Uber officially retired the Otto brand as a result of the lawsuit with Clearpath Robotics Inc.

In July 2018, Uber shuttered the Otto project and ceased development of self-driving trucks to focus on self-driving passenger vehicles.

== Technology and goals ==
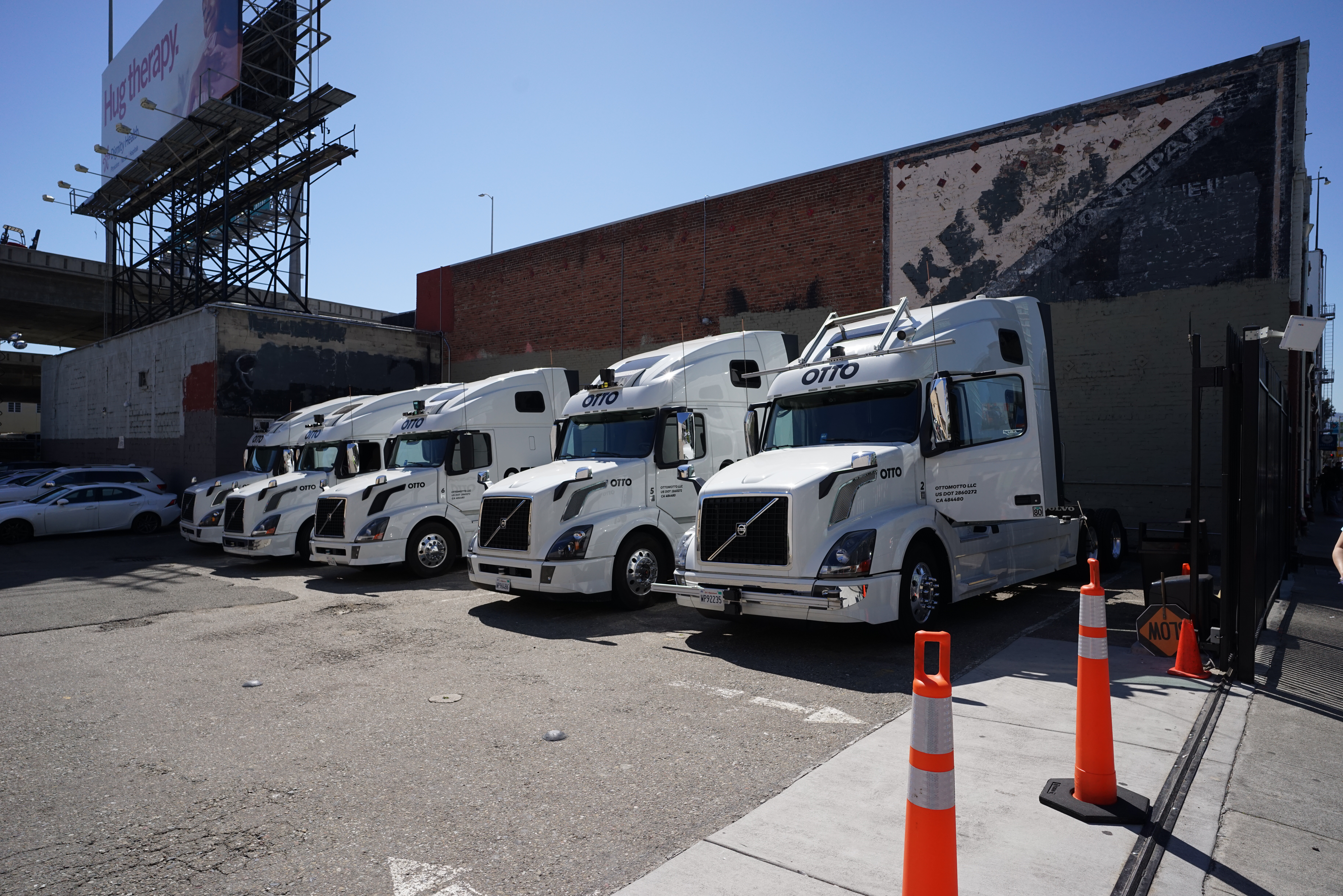
A fleet of Otto autonomous Volvo VNL tractor units equipped with various sensors

Otto did not build its own trucks. Instead, the company made hardware kits which could be installed on trucks at service centers or factories. They used similar technology to those developed by Google and Nissan, equipping the trucks with radar, cameras, and lidar.

The goal of the company over the first few years was stated to be for the technology to be used by truck drivers during long-haul drives to allow them to rest during the journey. This in turn would reduce the number of hours it took for drivers to complete a journey by potentially being able to drive continuously, and overcome the 11-hour legal restriction on manual driving. The automated technology was intended to make driving more efficient, and allow a truck driver to sleep while the truck is driving itself. In 2016, Levandowski stated: "Our goal is to make trucks drive as humanly as possible, but with the reliability of machines."

According to John Markoff of The New York Times, Otto made the conscious decision to automate trucks rather than passenger vehicles because, “Nationally, trucks drive 5.6 percent of all vehicle miles and are responsible for 9.5 percent of highway fatalities.” In an interview with Emily Chang of Bloomberg West, David Kirkpatrick, the CEO of Techonomy Media, stated that the public was far more likely to embrace trucks with automated driving than passenger vehicles due to the wide perception that trucks are driven dangerously by truckers. The need to make truck driving safer was one of the aims of the firm. Ron was quoted as saying: "We want to get the technology to the point where it's safe to let the driver rest and sleep in his cabin and we can drive for him, exit to exit."

Eventually the company hoped to develop trucks able to drive autonomously on the 220,000 miles of highways in the US, though in some states such as California there may have been regulatory obstacles. The firm intended to collect safety data to demonstrate the benefits of the automated technology.

== See also ==
- Starsky Robotics
