= Starsky Robotics =

Former autonomous truck company

- Type: Private
- Industry: Autonomous robotics (robotics, manufacturing, logistics)
- Founded: 2016
- Defunct: March 19, 2020
- Headquarters: San Francisco
- Key people: Stefan Seltz-Axmacher (CEO, co-founder); Kartik Tiwari (co-founder)
- Website: starsky.io (archived)

Starsky Robotics was an autonomous trucking company based in San Francisco, California. Founded in 2016 by Stefan Seltz-Axmacher and Kartik Tiwari, the company developed a hybrid system that combined highway autonomy with remote human teleoperation for last-mile and complex maneuvers. It gained notoriety for conducting the first public road test of a driverless freight truck with no one in the vehicle. Starsky ceased operations in 2020 following funding challenges and a slowdown in investor interest in autonomous vehicle startups.

== History ==
In 2017, Starsky Robotics announced that it had raised $5 million from Y Combinator, Sam Altman, Trucks VC, and Data Collective to create an autonomous trucking company. In 2018, the company closed a $16.5 million Series A, led by Shasta Ventures.

Their approach contrasted with that of competitors by emphasizing simplicity and immediate commercial applications over full end-to-end automation.

In 2018, the company began testing its remote teleoperation system in Florida. By 2019, Starsky had successfully completed the ‘’'first-ever unmanned freight run on a public highway’’', using a truck that drove 9.4 miles on the Florida Turnpike with no safety driver inside. The demonstration marked a milestone in autonomous vehicle history and showcased the viability of its mixed autonomy-human model.

In November 2019 over 85% of staff were laid off after the company failed to find further investment, due to concerns over the financial stability of its freight-hauling arm. By March 2020 the company sold off the remaining assets, including patents relating to operating remote vehicles.

== Technology ==
The company developed proprietary technology that allowed drivers to remotely pilot trucks from a central headquarters. The company successfully completed full deliveries with 85% autonomy. Starsky Robotics’ system worked to solve the issue of final-mile delivery by removing drivers from the cab entirely and putting them in an office where they could remotely operate the truck from terminal to delivery.

== Shutdown ==
Starsky Robotics ceased operations in early 2020. The closure was publicly announced in a widely read Medium post by co-founder Stefan Seltz-Axmacher. In the post, Seltz-Axmacher attributed the shutdown to declining investor enthusiasm in AV technologies, high capital needs, and slower-than-expected technical progress across the industry.

The postmortem sparked discussions across the tech industry for its candid assessment of the limitations of both the technology and the venture capital model in robotics.

== Legacy ==
Despite its short operational lifespan, Starsky Robotics left a lasting legacy in the autonomous vehicle sector. It was the first company to successfully operate a driverless freight truck on a public road, and its emphasis on practical autonomy and lean development influenced how other startups approached the problem. Its closure is often cited as a cautionary tale about the mismatch between deep-tech development timelines and startup funding cycles.

== See also ==
- Otto
- Komatsu Limited
