= Nursing Inquiry =

- Discipline: Nursing
- Language: English
- Edited by: Sally Thorne

Publication details
- History: 1994–present
- Publisher: John Wiley & Sons
- Frequency: Quarterly
- Impact factor: 2.393 (2020)

Standard abbreviations
- ISO 4: Nurs. Inq.

Indexing
- ISSN: 1320-7881 (print); 1440-1800 (web)
- LCCN: 00242281
- OCLC no.: 719766657

Links
- Journal homepage; Online access; Online archive

Nursing Inquiry is a quarterly peer-reviewed nursing journal. It was established in 1994 with Judy Parker (La Trobe University) as the founding editor-in-chief. Sioban Nelson (University of Toronto) succeeded Parker in 2006. It is published by John Wiley & Sons and the current editor-in-chief is Sally Thorne (University of British Columbia). According to the Journal Citation Reports, the journal has a 2020 impact factor of 2.393, ranking it 27th out of 124 journals in the category "Nursing (Science)" and 26th out of 122 in the category "Nursing (Social Science)".
