= Sally Thorne =

Nursing researcher

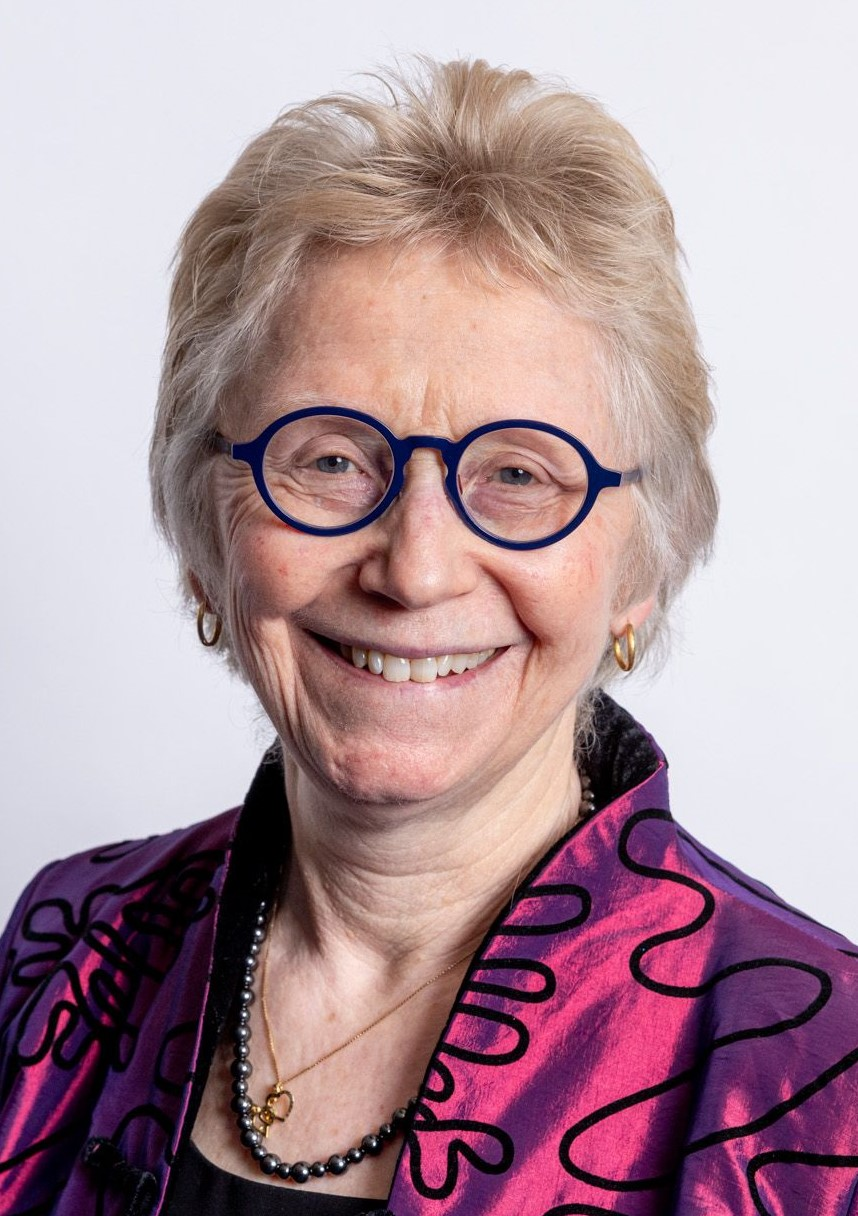
Photo of Sally Thorne

Sally Elizabeth Thorne CM, PhD, FAAN, FCAHS, FCAN, RN (born 1951) is a Canadian academic nursing teacher, researcher and author. She has studied the human experience of chronic illness and cancer, and developed qualitative research methodologies including metasynthesis and interpretive description.

== Biography and career ==
Thorne obtained her RN Diploma (1972) from the Atkinson School of Nursing at Toronto Western Hospital, BSN (1979) and MSN (1983) from the University of British Columbia School of Nursing, in Vancouver, Canada, and PhD from the Union Institute for Advanced Studies (1990), now the Union Institute & University, in Cincinnati, OH, USA.

Thorne joined the faculty of the University of British Columbia School of Nursing in 1983, and established a research program and methodological development in the area of health service delivery for patients with cancer and chronic disease.

From 2002 until 2010, Thorne served as the Director of the School. She then resumed an academic career, including political activities on behalf of the profession and a program of scholarship in advancing communication systems in cancer care. From 2012 to 2023 she also served as Associate Dean, Faculty of Applied Science. She continues to speak and consult internationally, and sits on numerous Boards and committees. She is Editor-in-Chief of Nursing Inquiry.

=== Theories and methods ===
- Interpretive Description: A qualitative research method which “provides a bridge between objective neutrality and abject theorizing” designed for the needs of the applied disciplines.
- Thorne, S. (2004). "Qualitative Metasynthesis: Reflections on Methodological Orientation and Ideological Agenda". Qualitative Health Research. 14 (10): 1342–65. doi:10.1177/1049732304269888. PMID 15538004. S2CID 26863882.
- Communication in Cancer Care: A program of research dedicated to supporting effective communication between cancer patients and health care professionals
- The Social Context of Chronic Illness: A program of patient-perspective research addressing system barriers to effective care for chronic diseases.
- Philosophy of Nursing Science: A program of philosophical inquiry dealing with matters of the nature of nursing, the nature of evidence claims related to human health complexity, and the theoretical traditions that underpin current thinking within the discipline.

=== Books ===
1. Thorne, S.E. (1993). Negotiating Health Care: The Social Context of Chronic Illness. Newbury Park, CA: Sage.
2. Thorne, S.E. & Hayes, V.E. (1997). Nursing Praxis: Knowledge and Action. Thousand Oaks, CA: Sage
3. Paterson, B., Thorne, S., Canam, C. & Jillings, C. (2001). Meta-Study of Qualitative Health Research: A Practical Guide to Meta-Analysis and Meta-Synthesis. Thousand Oaks, CA: Sage Publications
4. Thorne, S. (2008). Interpretive description. Walnut Creek, CA: Left Coast Press
5. Thorne, S. (2025). Interpretive Description: Qualitative Research for Applied Practice (3rd ed.). New York: Routledge.

== Awards and recognition ==
- Award of Distinction, Registered Nurses Association of British Columbia, 1999
- Fellow, Canadian Academy of Health Sciences, 2005
- Canada’s Top 100 Most Powerful Women Award, Women’s Executive Network, 2009
- Pfizer Award of Excellence for Nursing Research, Canadian Association of Nurses in Oncology, 2011
- Fellow, American Academy of Nursing, 2011
- Honorary doctorate, Queen's University, 2013
- Ethel Johns Award, Canadian Association of Schools of Nursing, 2013
- Order of Canada, 2023.
- Lifetime Achievement Award, Canadian Association of Nurses in Oncology, 2022
- Lifetime Achievement Award, Nurses & Nurse Practitioners of British Columbia, 2024
