= Jeffrey Weitz =

Canadian bioscientist

Jeffrey Weitz OC
- Scientific career
- Fields: Bioscience
- Workplaces: McMaster University

Jeffrey Ian Weitz OC is a Canadian bioscientist, currently the Canada Research Chair in Thrombosis and Endowed Chair in Cardiovascular Medicine at McMaster University.
