= Jan Söderqvist =

Swedish journalist

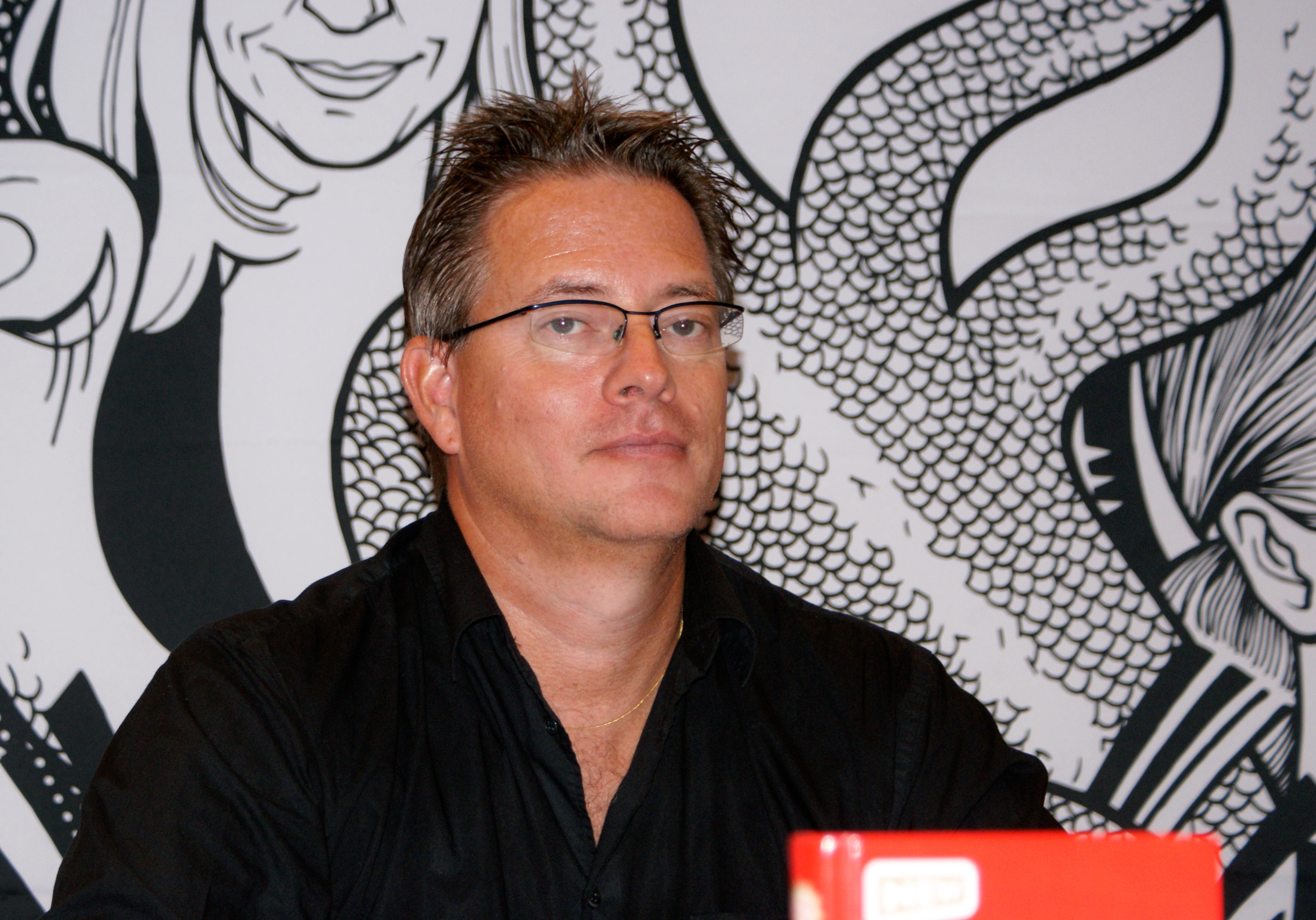
Jan Söderqvist at a book fair in 2009

Jan Söderqvist (born 1961) is an author, lecturer, writer and consultant, and among other things also working as a literary and film critic for the Swedish newspaper Svenska Dagbladet.

Söderqvist has written three books on the Internet revolution, collectively known as The Futurica Trilogy, together with philosopher Alexander Bard. Their first collaboration The Netocrats was originally released in Swedish in 2000, became available in English in 2003, and has since been translated to a further 16 languages with total worldwide sales exceeding 340,000 copies.

The second book The Global Empire was originally released in Swedish in 2003, while the third installment of the trilogy The Body Machines was originally published in Swedish in 2009. These latter two works were released in English in 2012, completing The Futurica Trilogy, in which the authors present their philosophical vision for a global and increasingly virtual society, as a consequence of the Internet revolution. Söderqvist and Bard released Syntheism: Creating God in the Internet Age, focusing on the metaphysics of the Internet age, in October 2014.

Söderqvist is known as a critic of laws regulating prostitution in Sweden and is one of the 15 founders of the Liberal Democratic Party of Sweden.
