= Raquel Urtasun =

Spanish-Canadian computer scientist (born 1976)

Raquel Urtasun OOnt FRSC FRS
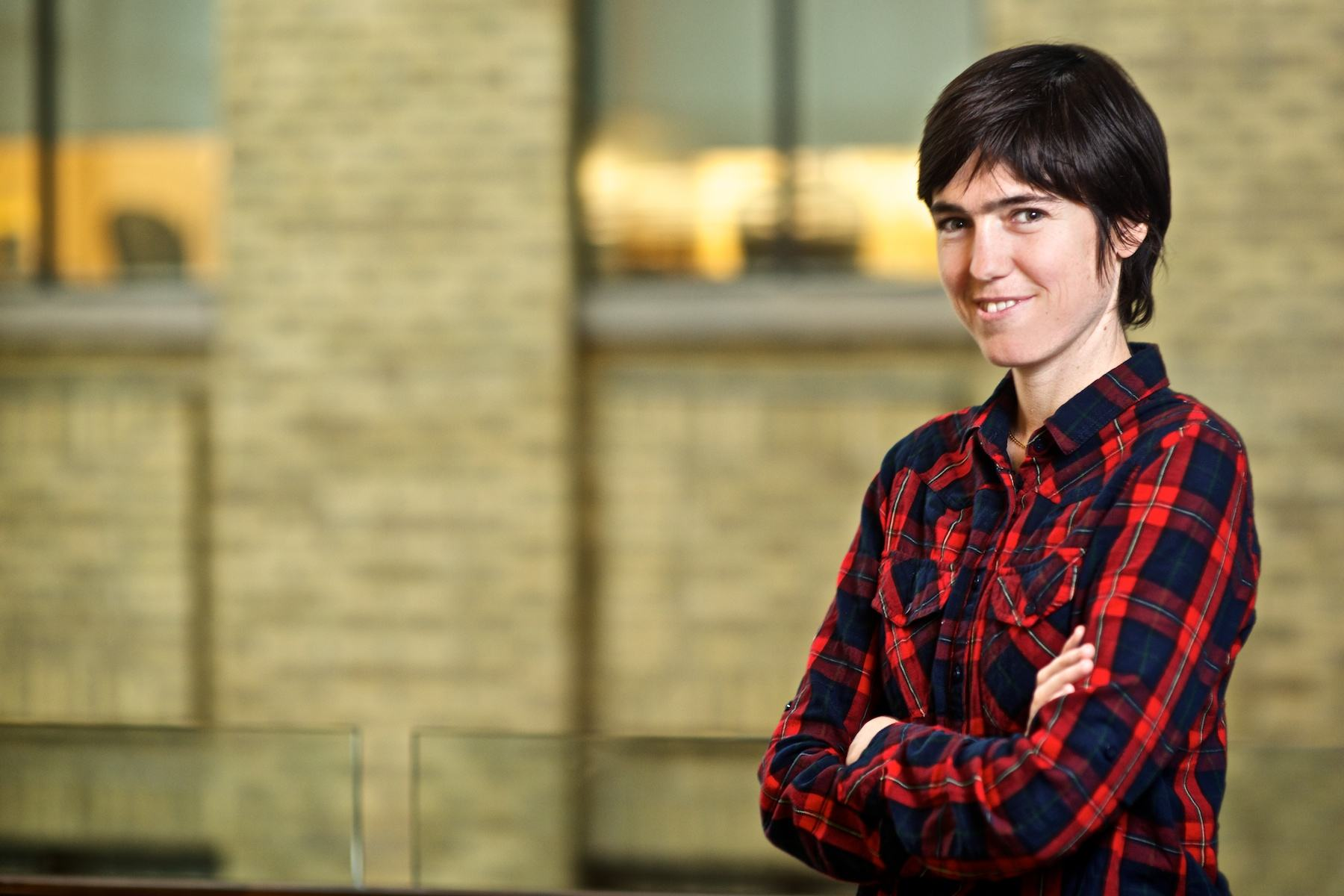
- Born: 30 January 1976 (age 50); Pamplona, Spain
- Education: Public University of Navarre; École Polytechnique Fédérale de Lausanne; MIT; UC Berkeley
- Known for: Self-driving cars, AI
- Scientific career
- Fields: Machine Learning, Computer Vision, Robotics, AI and Remote Sensing
- Workplaces: University of Toronto; ETH Zurich
- Thesis: Motion Models for Robust 3D Human Body Tracking (2006)
- Doctoral advisor: Pascal Vitali Fua
- Website: www.cs.toronto.edu/~urtasun/

Raquel Urtasun (born 30 January 1976) is a Spanish-Canadian computer scientist, entrepreneur, and professor at the University of Toronto. She is the founder and CEO of Waabi, a company developing autonomous driving technology using artificial intelligence. Urtasun's research focuses on the application of artificial intelligence to physical systems, to make vehicles and other machines perceive the world more accurately and efficiently.

== Early life and education ==
Urtasun was born and raised in Pamplona, Spain. She received a bachelor's degree in telecommunication engineering from the Universidad Publica de Navarra in Spain in 2000 and a Ph.D. in computer science from the École Polytechnique Fédérale de Lausanne (EPFL) in Switzerland in 2006. She was a postdoctoral scholar with Trevor Darrell, initially at the Massachusetts Institute of Technology (2006–2008) and then, following Darrell's move to the International Computer Science Institute, at the University of California, Berkeley (2008–2009).

== Career ==
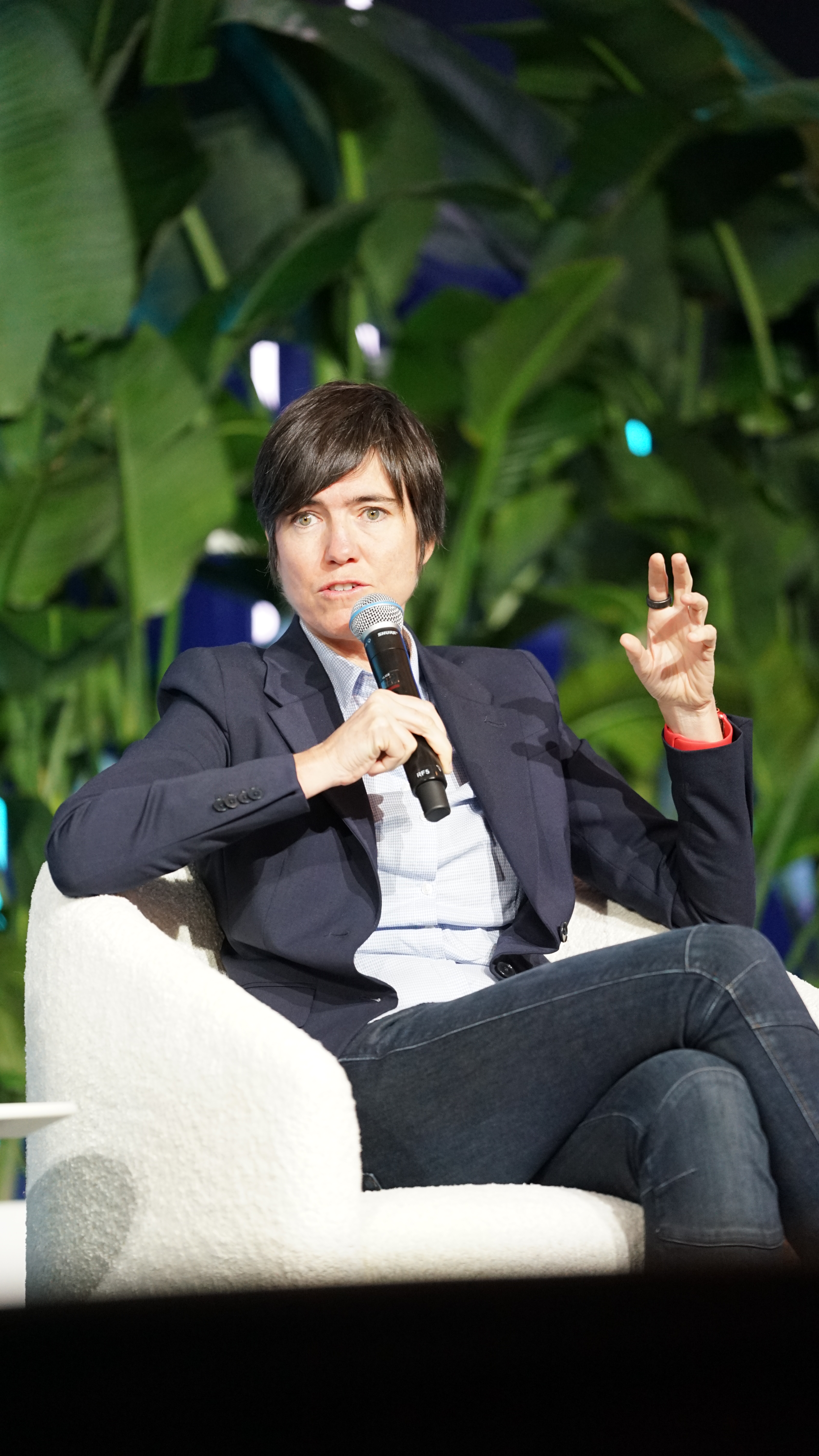
Urtasun at CES 2026

Urtasun was an assistant professor at the Toyota Technological Institute at Chicago (TTIC) from 2009 to 2014, and a visiting professor at ETH Zurich in 2010. In 2014, she immigrated to Canada, where she is a professor in the Department of Computer Science at the University of Toronto. She and Toronto professor Geoffrey Hinton are the founders of the Vector Institute, a Toronto-based artificial intelligence research institute that was established in 2017.

In May 2017, Uber hired Urtasun to lead a Toronto-based research team to develop self-driving car technology, as chief scientist and head of research and development of the company's Advanced Technologies Group.

In 2021, Urtasun left Uber to launch Waabi, a Toronto-based company focused on developing autonomous vehicle technology, where she is chief executive officer. Waabi uses generative AI to create simulation software through which self-driving technology can be tested, as opposed to logging miles on real-world roads. The company has partnered with Uber Freight and Volvo but has not yet begun commercial autonomous truck operation. Urtasun raised $83.5 million USD in seed funding to launch Waabi, one of the largest first funding rounds ever by a Canadian startup. In 2024, Waabi raised an additional $200 million, bringing total funding to over $280 million.

== Awards and honours ==
Among Urtasun's awards are an NSERC E.W.R. Steacie Memorial Fellowship, an NVIDIA Pioneers of AI Award, a Ministry of Education and Innovation Early Researcher Award. She is the recipient of Faculty Research Awards from both Amazon and Google, the latter three times. She was Program Chair of CVPR 2018, and is an editor of the International Journal in Computer Vision (IJCV). She has also been area chair of several machine learning and vision conferences including NeurIPS, UAI, ICML, ICLR, CVPR, and ECCV. She was selected as one of the Chatelaine Women of the Year 2018.

In 2023, she was named to Time magazine's list of the 100 Most Influential People in AI. In 2024, she was appointed to the Order of Ontario, and elected a Fellow of the Royal Society of Canada. She was named to CNBC's 2024 Changemakers list of women transforming business, and was a Fast Company AI 20 for 2025 honorees. She was elected a Fellow of the Royal Society in 2026.
