= André H. Caron =

Canadian scholar

André H. Caron CM
- Born: Montréal, Québec, Canada
- Other name: André Caron
- Education: Harvard University; Boston University; Université de Montréal
- Employer: Université de Montréal
- Title: Professor Emeritus, Département de communication
- Awards: Prix BBM (1989); Bell Chair in Interdisciplinary Research on Emerging Technologies (2003-2011); Premio Venezia (2010); Order of Canada (2022)

André H. Caron CM is a Canadian communication scholar whose research focuses predominantly on young people and media, and the appropriation of emerging technologies in society. Through his books and research projects, he examines social, cultural and policy issues, as well as the overall influence that traditional and new media have on family and the lives of children and youth.

== Professional career ==
Alongside Dr. James R. Taylor and Dr. Annie Méar he founded the first graduate program for Communication Studies in French Canada in 1974. He was Director of the Department of Communication at the Université de Montréal from 1985 to 1991. He is founding Director of the national Centre for Youth and Media Studies (GRJM\CYMS) (1988–2017). He was awarded the Bell Chair in interdisciplinary research on emerging technologies (2003-2011) and appointed scientific director of CITÉ (Centre for Interdisciplinary Research on Emerging Technologies) (2003–2011). In 2017 he was awarded by the Université de Montréal the title of "Professor Emeritus"for his exceptional career in teaching and research. During his career, he was invited as "Visiting Scholar" at Stanford University, Harvard University, Leicester university in the United Kingdom, Università di Bologna in Italy and at the University of Fribourg in Switzerland.

He held different positions on a number of boards such as chairman of the Board of MediaSmarts a Canadian not for profit organization for digital media literacy (formerly known as Media Awareness Network)], vice-president of the Board of directors of the National Film Board of Canada, and member of various Boards including Youth Media Alliance (formerly known as Children's Broadcast Institute), the Canadian Television Fund and the Bell New Media Fund.

== Major contributions ==
His research has played a determining role in Canadian policies with regards to children and media, as well as on the diffusion and cultural impact of information and communication technologies.

In terms of policy impact on children and youth, his work began addressing policy concerns as early as the 1970s, when he published his research on first-time exposure to television and their effects on Inuit children in northern Québec. His earlier work contributed to the Québec Office for Consumer Protection's proposal for legislation regulating the role and influence of media advertising targeted at children (1978). Additional research was also included in the recommendations put forth by the Ontario Royal Commission on counteracting violence in television (1979).

In 1986, his research was used by the department of communication of Canada to encourage the CRTC to hold hearings for a new private French television network in Quebec to counteract the growing number of francophone viewers drifting towards American television. His work is often referred to at CRTC hearings regarding the status of children and media.

He is known for his long-term quantitative studies and multi-methodological approaches, and has participated in several large-scale international initiatives such as the World Summit on Media and children (Australia, Greece, Sweden).

With regards to cultural impact, he was one of the first in coining the concept in French academia of "Culture Mobile" in 2005 (translation: Mobile Turn), in reference to the ways in which new technology redefines temporal and special societal constraints; an emphasis on the new nomadic identity of contemporary social actors.

To date, he has published numerous books and articles, and contributed to seminal work for the International Handbook for Children, Media and Culture and the Handbook of Child Well-Being.

== Books ==
Culture mobile: les nouvelles pratiques de communications (Presses de l'Université de Montréal, 2005)

Published in French with co-author Dr. Letizia Caronia, this book based on 6 years of research with young people explores the ways in which the mobile phone has been adopted in society and our everyday life, particularly in respect to youth, and the subsequent redefinition of social links and interpersonal relationships that have occurred in the family and society at large, ultimately creating the emergence of a "culture mobile".

Moving Cultures: Mobile Communication in Everyday Life (McGill-Queens, University Press, 2007)

Co-written with Dr. Letizia Caronia, it examines how teenagers have creatively adopted mobile phones in their social and cultural lives. This appropriation of cell phones exists as a verbal performance through which young people create culture, and argues that teenagers have domesticated and reinterpreted this technology. The book was also published in Italian in 2010.

Regulating Screens: Issues in Broadcasting and Internet Governance for Children (McGill-Queens, University Press 2013)

Published in 2013 with co-author Ronald I. Cohen, the book provides an overview of the existing rules and regulations that mediate the use of screens amongst children on an international scale (specifically in Canada, the United States, Australia, the United Kingdom, and the European Union) and furthers the examination of how governments and non-governmental organizations have been contributing to make television and the Internet safer for children.

== Awards ==
- 1989 – BBM Canada Award: In recognition for an exceptional contribution to the radio-television industry
- 2001 – Appointment by the Governor General of Canada to be member of the board of direction for the National Film Board of Canada
- 2003 - Bell Chair in Interdisciplinary Research on Emerging Technologies at the Université de Montréal
- 2010 - Premio Venezia: Prize awarded by the Italian Chamber of Commerce in Canada to Cité for excellence in the scientific field for collaboration between Québécois and Italian academic institutions
- 2017 - Awarded the title of Professor Emeritus by the Université de Montréal
- 2022 - Order of Canada (Member)
