= Jayanne English =

Canadian astronomer

Jayanne English is a Canadian multi-wavelength astronomer whose research concerns galaxy formation and evolution, galaxy mergers, intergalactic gas clouds, and Polar-ring galaxies. She is also known as a science communicator for her work in scientific visualization and in particular on the use of colour in images of galaxies. Formerly an associate professor of astronomy at the University of Manitoba, she continues to hold an affiliation with the University of Manitoba as a senior scholar.

== Education and career ==
English is the daughter of a landscape painter, from a family of painters. She grew up in Southern Ontario, and became interested in astronomy through skywatching in summer trips to cottage country and through a childhood interest in science fiction. Instead of going to university from high school, she took a retail job, and studied part time at several schools before completing a General Studies program at the Ontario College of Art in Toronto in 1984. She continued her education with a bachelor's degree in physics and astronomy at the University of Toronto in 1989, and a Ph.D. in astronomy and astrophysics at the Australian National University, completed in 1994.

She became a postdoctoral scholar with the Canadian Galactic Plane Survey at Queen's University at Kingston from 1994 to 1998, and at NASA working in the Space Telescope Science Institute from 1998 to 2000. Her work at NASA involved the Hubble Heritage Project, and it was through this that she connected her earlier art education with astronomy in the colorization of galaxy images.

She became an assistant professor at the University of Manitoba in 2000, and was promoted to associate professor in 2005.

== Recognition ==
An image created by English with Jeroen Stil and Russ Taylor of the University of Calgary won the 2006 National Radio Astronomy Observatory Radio Astronomy Image Contest.

English was the 2021 recipient of the Qilak Award for Astronomy Communications of the Canadian Astronomical Society (CASCA), for her work building "a unique outreach program that bridges art and science". She was named to the Order of Canada (CM) in 2023, "honoured for her innovative work at the crossroads of science and art, and for making astronomy accessible to all".
