= Syntheism =

New religious movement

Logo used by The Syntheist Movement, describing the Universe as an ellipse over the circle of the primordial void.

Syntheism is a new religious movement that is focused on how atheists and pantheists can achieve the same feelings of community and awe experienced in traditional theistic religions. The Syntheist Movement sees itself as the practical realisation of a philosophical ambition for a new religion dating back as far as Baruch Spinoza's philosophy in the 17th century and, most directly, British-American philosopher Alfred North Whitehead's pioneering work towards a process theology in his books Religion in the Making in 1926 and Process and Reality in 1929.

Syntheism may also be viewed as a response to the lack of atheistic and pantheistic belief systems in Western cultures (outside of Epicureanism), while being more abundant in Eastern cultures, for example as Buddhism, Advaita Vedanta Hinduism, and Jainism.

== Etymology ==
Syntheism was coined from the Greek syntheos (from syn- for with or creating with and -theos for god). It implies that the proper approach to the concept of God is that humanity has created, creates or will eventually create God – as opposed to the traditional monotheistic view that God created the world and humanity.

Besides the activism of The Syntheist Movement, a syntheistic approach to philosophy and religion has also been advocated by American philosopher Ray Kurzweil in his concept of the forthcoming Singularity. It is also supported by French philosopher Quentin Meillassoux in his idea of "God is a concept far too important to leave to the religious" in his book After Finitude.

== Communities ==
Syntheism has an international Facebook community with over 1,500 members. Its website hosts a blog, holy festival information, and links to media and other resources. A Swedish community of over 700 members has held several local events.

Spiritual naturalism is considered to be an American version of Syntheism.

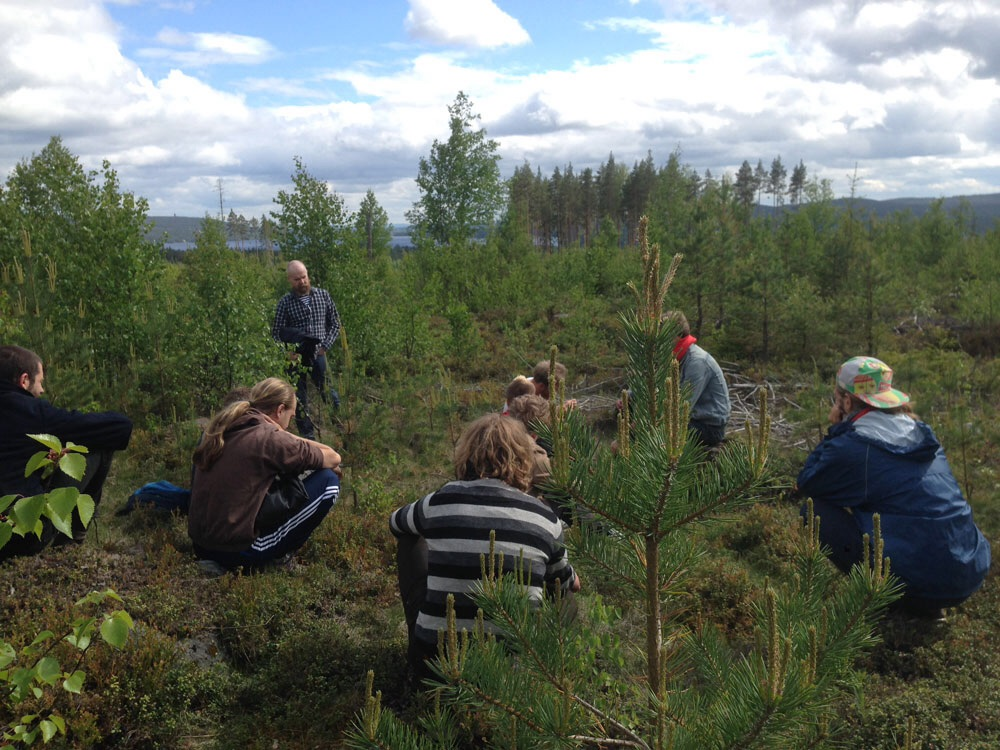
A Syntheist congregation conducting a workshop in Lindsberg, Sweden in June 2014.

== Notable works ==
When Swedish cyberphilosophers Alexander Bard and Jan Söderqvist published their syntheist manifesto Syntheism - Creating God in the Internet Age in October 2014, it became the first book to actively use the term Syntheism in its title. Bard & Söderqvist frequently quote Stuart Kauffman, Sam Harris, Robert Corrington and Simon Critchley in the book, but also find inspiration for a syntheist worldview from a variety of contemporary phenomena such as digitalisation, globalisation, participatory culture, psychedelic practices, quantum physics and the science of cosmology.

== Beliefs ==
Syntheism is the belief that the classic division between theism and atheism in theology has become redundant and must be overcome to fulfill contemporary and future spiritual needs. This requires the acknowledgement that all metaphysical beliefs center on a divinity or focal point which is man-made. Therefore, all current and future religious beliefs are created by humans, as well as systems such as Individualism developed by philosophers like Immanuel Kant.

Despite being human creations, what is important is that these beliefs strengthen, and not contradict, science. They must therefore be developed within a monist worldview (the conviction that there is one world and one world only, and that everything within this one world can affect everything else). In a more poetic vein, Bataille describes his atheology as “the art of non-knowledge”. He rather advocates a syntheist religion without a core set of beliefs. Participatory festivals with utopian themes such as Burning Man are considered examples of syntheistic practice.

To me, the name “God” is an amazing name for all the dreams of humanity projected into one point. What would you name that? You would name it God. And that is what we need to do, to retake the “God” word but just give God proper qualities that we can actually believe in. In that case, Syntheos is the God that we choose to believe in and can believe in. Whatever that means.

— Alexander Bard, "Alexander Bard on Syntheism: Death, God, the Universe, and Burning Man", The Forumist

== Criticisms ==
Lack of central leadership and core beliefs have led some scholars, such as Dr. Stephen O'Leary, to believe Syntheism will fail. The idea has also been criticised for a potential lack of mystery.

== See also ==
- Shendao shejiao
