= Vehicular communication systems =

Computer networks in which vehicles and roadside units are the communicating nodes

Vehicular communication systems are computer networks in which vehicles and roadside units are the communicating nodes, providing each other with information, such as safety warnings and traffic information. They can be effective in avoiding accidents and traffic congestion. Both types of nodes are dedicated short-range communications (DSRC) devices. DSRC works in 5.9 GHz band with bandwidth of 75 MHz and approximate range of 300 metres (980 ft). Vehicular communications is usually developed as a part of intelligent transportation systems (ITS).

== History ==
The beginnings of vehicular communications go back to the 1970s. Work began on projects such as Electronic Route Guidance System (ERGS) and CACS in the United States and Japan respectively. While the term inter-vehicle communication (IVC) began to circulate in the early 1980s. Various media were used before the standardization activities began, such as lasers, infrared, and radio waves.

The PATH project in the United States between 1986 and 1997 was an important breakthrough in vehicular communications projects. Projects related to vehicular communications in Europe were launched with the PROMETHEUS project between 1986 and 1995. Numerous subsequent projects have been implemented all over the world such as the Advanced Safety Vehicle (ASV) program, CHAUFFEUR I and II, FleetNet, CarTALK 2000, etc.

In the early 2000s, the term vehicular ad hoc network (VANET) was introduced as an application of the principles of mobile ad hoc networks (MANETs) to the vehicular field. The terms VANET and IVC do not differ and are used interchangeably to refer to communications between vehicles with or without reliance on roadside infrastructure, although some have argued that IVC refers to direct V2V connections only. Many projects have appeared in EU, Japan, USA and other parts of the world for example, ETC, SAFESPOT, PReVENT, COMeSafety, NoW, IVI.

Several terms have been used to refer to vehicular communications. These acronyms differ from each other either in historical context, technology used, standard, or country (vehicle telematics, DSRC, WAVE, VANET, IoV, 802.11p, ITS-G5, V2X). Currently, cellular based on 3GPP-Release 16 and WiFi based on IEEE 802.11p have proven to be potential communication technologies enabling connected vehicles. However, this does not negate that other technologies for example, VLC, ZigBee, WiMAX, microwave, mmWave are still a vehicular communication research area.

Many organizations and governmental agencies are concerned with issuing standards and regulation for vehicular communication (ASTM, IEEE, ETSI, SAE, 3GPP, ARIB, TTC, TTA, CCSA, ITU, 5GAA, ITS America, ERTICO, ITS Asia-Pacific). 3GPP is working on standards and specifications for cellular-based V2X communications, while IEEE is working through the study group Next Generation V2X (NGV) on the issuance of the standard 802.11bd.

== Safety benefits ==
The main motivation for vehicular communication systems is safety and eliminating the excessive cost of traffic collisions. According to the World Health Organization (WHO), road accidents annually cause approximately 1.2 million deaths worldwide; one fourth of all deaths caused by injury. Also about 50 million persons are injured in traffic accidents. Road death was the ninth-leading cause of death in 1990. A study from the American Automobile Association (AAA) concluded that car crashes cost the United States $300 billion per year. It can be used for automated traffic intersection control.

However the deaths caused by car crashes are in principle avoidable. The U.S. Department of Transportation states that 21,000 of the annual 43,000 road accident deaths in the US are caused by roadway departures and intersection-related incidents. This number can be significantly lowered by deploying local warning systems through vehicular communications. Departing vehicles can inform other vehicles that they intend to depart the highway and arriving cars at intersections can send warning messages to other cars traversing that intersection. They can also notify when they intend to change lanes or if there is a traffic jam. According to a 2010 study by the US National Highway Traffic Safety Administration, vehicular communication systems could help avoid up to 79% of all traffic accidents. Studies show that in Western Europe a mere 5 km/h decrease in average vehicle speeds could result in 25% decrease in deaths.

== Vehicle-to-vehicle ==
Over the years, there have been considerable research and projects in this area, applying VANETs for a variety of applications, ranging from safety to navigation and law enforcement. In December 2016, the US Department of Transportation proposed draft rules that would gradually make V2V communication capabilities to be mandatory for light-duty vehicles. The technology is not completely specified, so critics have argued that manufacturers "could not take what’s in this document and know what their responsibility will be under the Federal Motor Vehicle Safety Standards". PKI (public key infrastructure) is the current security system being used in V2V communications.

=== Conflict over spectrum ===
V2V is under threat from cable television and other tech firms that want to take away a big chunk of the radio spectrum currently reserved for it and use those frequencies for high-speed internet service. In the USA, V2V's current share of the radio spectrum was set aside by the government in 1999, but has gone unused. The automotive industry is trying to retain all it can, saying that it desperately needs the spectrum for V2V. The Federal Communications Commission (FCC) has taken the side of the tech companies, with the National Transportation Safety Board supporting the position of the automotive industry. Internet service providers (who want to use the spectrum) claim that autonomous cars will render V2V communication unnecessary. The US automotive industry has said that it is willing to share the spectrum if V2V service is not slowed or disrupted; and the FCC plans to test several sharing schemes.

With governments in different locales supporting incompatible spectra for V2V communication, vehicle manufacturers may be discouraged from adopting the technology for some markets. In Australia for instance, there is no spectrum reserved for V2V communication, so vehicles would suffer interference from non-vehicle communications. The spectra reserved for V2V communications in some locales are as follows:

Locale	Spectra
USA	5.855-5.905 GHz
Europe	5.855-5.925 GHz
Japan	5.770-5.850 GHz; 715-725 MHz
Australia	5.855-5.925 GHz

== Vehicle-to-infrastructure ==
In 2012, computer scientists at the University of Texas in Austin began developing smart intersections designed for automated cars. The intersections will have no traffic lights and no stop signs, instead of using computer programs that will communicate directly with each car on the road. In the case of autonomous vehicles, it is essential for them to connect with other 'devices' in order to function most effectively. Autonomous vehicles are equipped with communication systems that allow them to communicate with other autonomous vehicles and roadside units to provide them, amongst other things, with information about road work or traffic congestion. In addition, scientists believe that the future will have computer programs that connect and manage each individual autonomous vehicle as it navigates through an intersection. These types of characteristics drive and further develop the ability of autonomous vehicles to understand and cooperate with other products and services (such as intersection computer systems) in the autonomous vehicles market. Eventually, this can lead to more autonomous vehicles using the network because the information has been validated through the usage of other autonomous vehicles. Such movements will strengthen the value of the network and are called network externalities.

In 2017, Researchers from Arizona State University developed a 1/10 scale intersection and proposed an intersection management technique called Crossroads. It was shown that Crossroads is very resilient to network delay of both V2I communication and Worst-case Execution time of the intersection manager. In 2018, a robust approach was introduced which is resilient to both model mismatch and external disturbances such as wind and bumps.

== Vehicle-to-everything ==
In November 2019, an applications of Cellular V2X (Cellular Vehicle-to-Everything) based on 5G were demonstrated on open city streets and a test track in Turin. V2V equipped cars broadcast a message to following vehicles in the case of sudden braking to notify them timely of the potentially dangerous situation. Other applications demonstrated use cases such as; alerting drivers about a crossing pedestrian.

== Key players ==
Intelligent Transportation Society of America (ITSA) aims to improve cooperation among public and private sector organizations. ITSA summarizes its mission statement as "vision zero" meaning its goal is to reduce the fatal accidents and delays as much as possible.

Many universities are pursuing research and development of vehicular ad hoc networks. For example, University of California, Berkeley is participating in California Partners for Advanced Transit and Highways (PATH).

== See also ==
- Artificial Passenger
- Carputer
- Device-to-device
- Intelligent transportation system
- Intelligent Transportation Systems Institute
- Mobile ad hoc network
- Mobile phone tracking
- Radio
- Self-driving car
- Vehicular ad hoc network
- Wireless LAN
