= Automotive privacy =

Automotive privacy concerns the privacy of automobiles. Cars were described as the worst product category for privacy by the Mozilla Foundation in 2023.

The prevalence of connected cars increases the data collected including personal data such as biometric, driving behavior, facial expressions, immigration status, location, race, sexual activity, video footage and other telematic data.

Location data has been reported to be sold to data brokers and given to law enforcement including without a warrant.

In January 2026, the U.S. Federal Trade Commission settled a complaint with General Motors and OnStar about collection and sale of consumer location data without adequate notification and consent.

== See also ==
- Automotive security
