= Smart car =

Smart car may refer to:

- Smart (marque), the automobile brand
- Smart Fortwo, the aforementioned brand’s most iconic car
- Smartcar (company), the API developer platform company
- Autonomous car, an automobile capable of driving itself
- Connected car, an automobile that coordinates its navigation with others'
- Vehicular automation, using artificial intelligence to enhance or automate control of a vehicle
