= Vehicle-to-device =

Vehicle-to-device (V2D) communication is a particular type of vehicular communication system that consists in the exchange of information between a vehicle and any electronic device that may be connected to the vehicle itself.

The ever-increasing tendency of developing mobile applications for our everyday use has ultimately entered also the automotive sector. Vehicle connectivity with mobile apps have the great potential to offer a better driving experience, by providing information regarding the surrounding vehicles and infrastructure and making the interaction between the car and its driver much simpler. The fact that apps may significantly improve driving safety has attracted the attention of car users and caused a rise in the number of new apps developed specifically for the car industry. This trend has such a great influence that now manufacturers are beginning to design cars taking care of their interaction with mobile phones. For example, starting from 2017 Volvo is going to sell keyless cars, thanks to an app that makes it possible to open and start the vehicle remotely. Another sector that could coherently benefit from this technology is car sharing.

== See also ==
- Vehicular communication systems
- Vehicle-to-everything communication (V2X)
- Vehicular ad hoc network (V2V)
- Vehicle-to-grid electricity delivery (V2G)
- Vehicle-to-vehicle battery charging (V2V)
