= Connected car =

Car that can communicate bidirectionally with other systems outside of the car

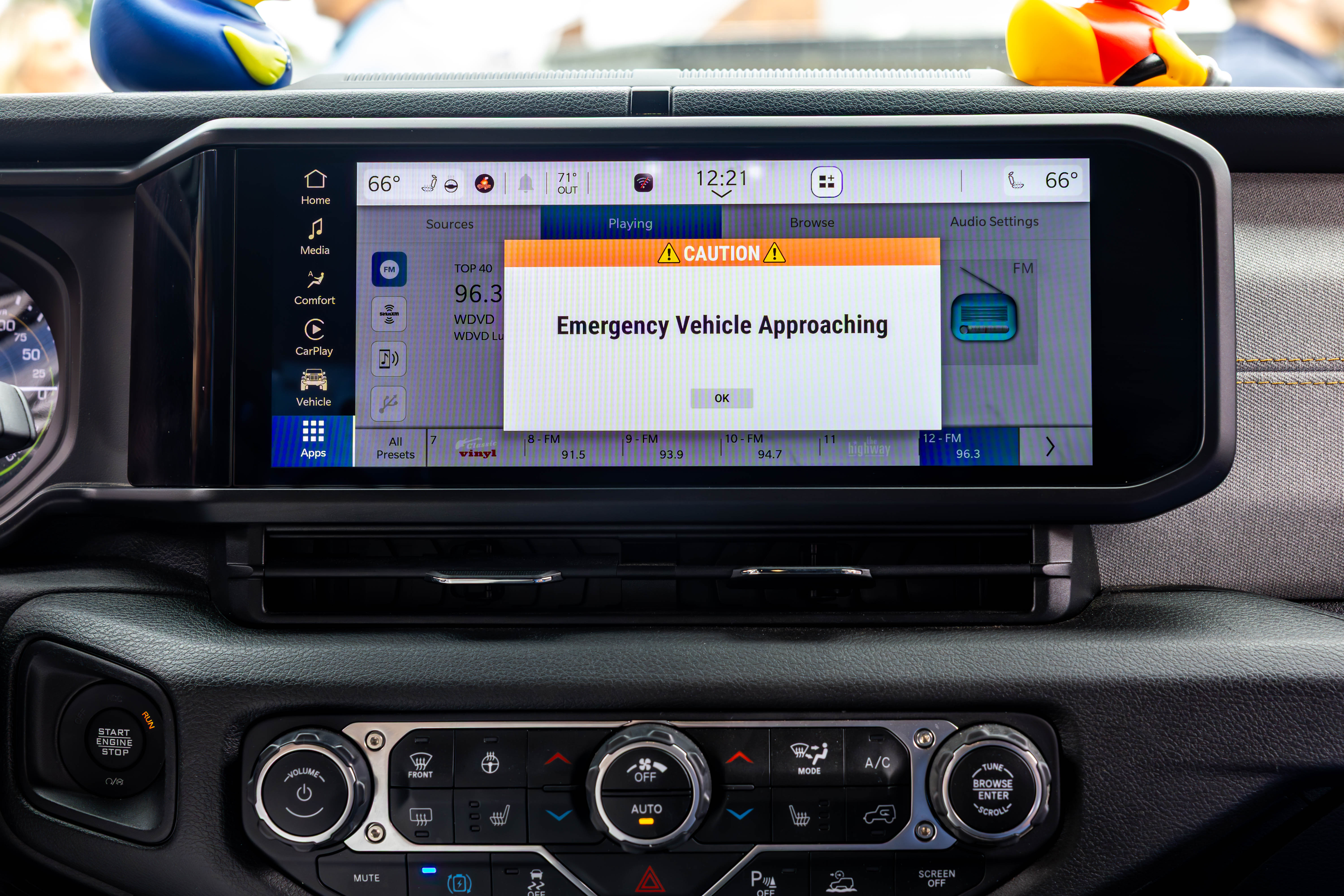
Connected car technology can provide alerts of approaching emergency vehicles. Pictured, a Jeep Wrangler (JL) receives an alert as part of a pilot program in Detroit.

A connected car is a car that can communicate bidirectionally with other systems outside of the car. This connectivity can be used to provide services to passengers (such as music, identification of local businesses, and navigation through a journey planner) or to support or enhance self-driving functionality (such as coordination with other cars, receiving software updates, or integration into a ride hailing service). For safety-critical applications, it is anticipated that cars will also be connected using dedicated short-range communications (DSRC) or cellular radios, operating in the FCC-granted 5.9 GHz band with very low latency.

== History ==
General Motors was the first automaker to bring the first connected car features to market with OnStar in 1996 in Cadillac DeVille, Seville and Eldorado. OnStar was created by GM working with Motorola Automotive (that was later bought by Continental). The primary purpose was safety and to get emergency help to a vehicle when there was an accident. The sooner medical helps arrives the more likely the drivers and passengers would survive. A cellular telephone call would be routed to a call center where the agent sent help.

At first, OnStar only worked with voice but when cellular systems added data the system was able to send GPS location data to the call center. After the success of OnStar, many automakers followed with similar safety programs that usually come with a free trial for a new car and then a paid subscription after the trial is over.

Remote diagnostics were introduced in 2001. By 2003 connected car services included vehicle health reports, turn-by-turn directions and a network access device. Data-only telematics were first offered in 2007, transmitting telemetry data without a voice component.

In the summer of 2014, Audi was the first automaker to offer 4G LTE Wi-Fi Hotspots access and the first mass deployment of 4G LTE was by General Motors.

By 2015, OnStar had processed 1 billion requests from customers.

The AA (formerly known as The Automobile Association) introduced Car Genie, the first piece of connected car technology in the UK that connects directly to a breakdown service, not only warning of issues with car health, but intervening directly with a phone call to customers to help them prevent a breakdown.

In 2017, European technology start-up Stratio Automotive provided over 10,000 vehicles predictive intelligence enabling fleet operators to better manage and maintain their vehicles.

== Types of connectivity ==
There are 7 ways a vehicle can be connected to its surroundings and communicate with them. These connections are all a part of Vehicle to Everything - V2X:

1. V2I "Vehicle to Infrastructure": The technology captures data generated by the vehicle and provides information about the infrastructure to the driver. The V2I technology communicates information about safety, mobility or environment-related conditions, forming a key part of an intelligent transportation system.
2. V2V "Vehicle to Vehicle": The technology communicates information about speed and position of surrounding vehicles through a wireless exchange of information. The goal is to avoid accidents, ease traffic congestions and have a positive impact on the environment.
3. V2C "Vehicle to Cloud": The technology exchanges information about and for applications of the vehicle with a cloud system. This allows the vehicle to use information from other, though the cloud connected industries like energy, transportation and smart homes and make use of IoT.
4. V2P "Vehicle to Pedestrian": The technology senses information about its environment and communicates it to other vehicles, infrastructure and personal mobile devices. This enables the vehicle to communicate with pedestrians and is intended to improve safety and mobility on the road.
5. V2D "Vehicle to Device": The technology connects your vehicle to any other device such as bluetooth or mobile phones. This is how vehicles can connect to a multitude of apps built to improve driver safety and experience.
6. V2N "Vehicle to Network": The technology allows vehicles to utilize cell tower networks to communicate with nearby vehicles and road infrastructure. Vehicles can receive alerts and communicate with nearby data centers connected to WiFi or 5G.
7. V2G "Vehicle to Grid": The technology allows electric vehicles to communicate with the power grid. This technology allows for two-way energy flow; not only can EVs draw energy from the power grid to charge their batteries, but they can also send energy back to the grid from their batteries when needed. V2G enables power companies to use parked electric vehicles as a sort of decentralized energy storage solution to help balance demand on the electrical grid.

== Categories of applications ==
Applications can be separated into two categories:

1. Single vehicle applications: In-car content and service applications implemented by a single vehicle in connection with a cloud or backoffice.
2. Cooperative safety and efficiency applications: they provide connectivity between vehicles (or infrastructure) directly have to work cross-brand and cross-borders and require standards and regulation. Some may be convenience applications, others safety, which may require regulation.

Examples include, amongst others:

1. Single-vehicle applications: concierge features provided by automakers or apps alert the driver of the time to leave to arrive on time from a calendar and send text message alerts to friends or business associates to alert them of arrival times such as BMW Connected NA that also helps find parking or gas stations. The European eCall would be an example of a single vehicle safety application that is mandatory in the EU.
2. Cooperative safety-of-life and cooperative efficiency: forward collision warning, lane change warning/blind spot warning, emergency brake light warning, intersection movement assist, emergency vehicle approaching, road works warning, automatic notification of crashes, notification of speeding and safety alerts.

The connected car segment can be further classified into eight categories.

- Mobility management: functions that allow the driver to reach a destination quickly, safely, and in a cost-efficient manner (e.g.: Current traffic information, Parking lot or garage assistance, Optimised fuel consumption)
- Commerce: functions enabling users to purchase good or services while on-the-go (e.g., fuel, food & beverage, parking, tolls)
- Vehicle management: functions that aid the driver in reducing operating costs and improving ease of use (e.g., vehicle condition and service reminders, remote operation, transfer of usage data)
- Breakdown prevention: connected to a breakdown service, with a back end algorithm predicting breakdowns and an outbound service intervening via phone, SMS or push notification
- Safety: functions that warn the driver of external hazards and internal responses of the vehicle to hazards (e.g., emergency breaking, lane keeping, adaptive cruise control, blind spot object identification)
- Entertainment: functions involving the entertainment of the driver and passengers (e.g., smartphone interface, WLAN hotspot, music, video, Internet, social media, mobile office)
- Driver assistance: functions involving partially or fully automatic driving (e.g., operational assistance or autopilot in heavy traffic, in parking, or on highways)
- Well-being: functions involving the driver's comfort and ability and fitness to drive (e.g., fatigue detection, automatic environment adjustments to keep drivers alert, medical assistance)

== Single-vehicle applications ==
Current automobiles entail embedded navigation systems, smartphone integration and multimedia packages. Typically, a connected car made after 2010 has a head-unit, in car entertainment unit, in-dash system with a screen from which the operations of the connections can be seen or managed by the driver. Types of functions that can be made include music/audio playing, smartphone apps, navigation, roadside assistance, voice commands, contextual help/offers, parking apps, engine controls and car diagnosis.

On January 6, 2014, Google announced the formation of the Open Automotive Alliance (OAA) a global alliance of technology and auto industry leaders committed to bringing the Android platform to cars starting in 2014. The OAA includes Audi, GM, Google, Honda, Hyundai and Nvidia.

On March 3, 2014, Apple announced a new system to connect iPhone 5/5c/5S to car infotainment units using iOS 7 to cars via a Lightning connector, called CarPlay.

Android Auto was announced on June 25, 2014, to provide a way for Android smartphones to connect to car infotainment systems.

Increasingly, connected cars (and especially electric cars) are taking advantage of the rise of smartphones, and apps are available to interact with the car from any distance. Users can unlock their cars, check the status of batteries on electric cars, find the location of the car, or remotely activate the climate control system.

Innovations to be introduced until 2020 include the full integration of smartphone applications, such as the linkage of the smartphone calendar, displaying it on the car's windshield and automatic address searches in the navigation system for calendar entries. In the longer term, navigation systems will be integrated in the windshield and through augmented reality project digital information, like alerts and traffic information, onto real images from the driver's perspective.

Near-term innovations regarding Vehicle Relationship Management (VRM) entail advanced remote services, such as GPS tracking and personalized usage restrictions. Further, maintenance services like over-the-air tune-ups, requiring the collaboration of car dealers, OEMs and service centers, are under development.

Despite various market drivers there are also barriers that have prevented the ultimate breakthrough of the connected car in the past few years. One of these is the fact that customers are reluctant to pay the extra costs associated with embedded connectivity and instead use their smartphones as solution for their in-car connectivity needs. Because this barrier is likely to continue, at least in the short-term, car manufacturers are turning to smartphone integration in an effort to satisfy consumer demand for connectivity.

== Cooperative safety-of-life and efficiency ==
These services relate to Advanced Driver-Assistance Systems (ADAS), that depend on the sensory input of more than one vehicle and enable instant reaction through automatic monitoring, alerting, braking and steering activities. They depend on instant vehicle-to-vehicle communication, as well as infrastructure, functioning across brands and national borders and offering cross-brand and cross-border levels of privacy and security. The US National Highway Traffic Safety Administration (NHTSA) for that reason has argued for regulation in its Advance Notice of Proposed Rulemaking (ANPRM) on V2V Communication and argued the case in US Congress. NHTSA began the rule-making process on December 13, 2016, proposing to mandate dedicated short-range communications (DSRC) technology in new light vehicles. Under this proposed rule, vehicles would broadcast a defined data packet, the "basic safety message" (BSM) up to ten times per second, indicating vehicle location, heading, and speed. In March, 2017, GM became the first US automaker to provide DSRC as standard equipment on a production automobile, the Cadillac CTS. The US also has appropriate standards – IEEE 802.11p – and frequency rules in place. In Europe a frequency is harmonised for transport safety and a harmonised standard, called ETSI ITS-G5, are in place. In the EU there is no push to oblige vehicle manufacturers to introduce connect. Discussions about a regulatory framework for privacy and security are ongoing.

Technologically speaking cooperative applications can be implemented. Here the regulatory framework is the main obstacle to implementation, questions like privacy and security need to be addressed. British weekly "The Economist" even argues that the matter is regulatory driven.

=== Roadway projects ===
The Michigan Department of Transportation announced in 2020 it would pilot a dedicated lane for connected autonomous vehicles on Interstate 94 between Ann Arbor and Detroit. Construction began in 2023, upgrading the left lane for a 3 mi (4.8 km) stretch.

== Hardware ==
The necessary hardware can be divided into built-in or brought-in connection systems. The built-in telematics boxes most commonly have a proprietary Internet connection via a GSM module and are integrated in the car IT system. Although most connected cars in the United States use the GSM operator AT&T with a GSM SIM such as the case with Volvo, some cars such as the Hyundai Blue Link system utilizes Verizon Wireless Enterprise, a non-GSM CDMA operator.

Most brought-in devices are plugged in the OBD (on-board diagnostics) port for electrification and access to vehicle data and can further be divided into two types of connection:

- Hardware relies on customers smartphone for the Internet connection or
- Hardware establishes proprietary internet connection via GSM module.

All forms of hardware have typical use cases as drivers. The built-in solutions were mostly driven by safety regulations in Europe for an automated Emergency Call (abbr. eCall). The brought-in devices usually focus on one customer segment and one specific use case.

== Insurance ==
The data provided by greater vehicle connectivity is impacting the car insurance industry. Predictive-modeling and machine-learning technologies, as well as real-time data streaming, providing among others information on driving speed, routes and time, are changing insurers' doing-of-business. Early adopters have begun to adjust their offering to the developments in the automotive industry, leading them to transition from being pure insurance product provider to becoming insurance-service hybrids.

Progressive, for example, has introduced its usage-based-insurance program, Snapshot, in 2008, which takes into account driving times and ability. The data gathered through an onboard diagnostics device allows the company to perform further personal and regional risk assessments. Another innovation being tested in the insurance industry regards telematics devices, which transmit vehicle and driver data through wide-area networks and are subsequently used to influence driving behavior, for legal purposes and the identification of fraudulent insurance claims. Further applications are dynamic risk profiles and improved customer segmentation. Future services include coaching on driving skills for fuel efficiency and safety reasons, the prediction of maintenance needs and providing advice to car owners regarding the best time to sell their car.

== Trends ==
The following trends are strengthening the shift towards a fully developed connected cars industry, changing the concept of what is understood as a car and what are its functions.

Technological innovation in the field of connectivity is accelerating. High-speed computers help make the car aware of its surroundings, which can transform manoeuvring a self-driving vehicle an increasing reality.

There are initiatives to use Ethernet technology to connect the sensors that allow for advanced driving assistance systems (ADAS). Through the Ethernet, network speed inside the vehicle can increase from one megabit to gigabits. Further, Ethernet uses switches that allow connections to any number of devices, reducing the amount of cabling required and thus the overall weight of the car. Moreover, it is more scalable, allowing devices and sensors to connect at different speeds and has the benefit of components being available off the shelf.

In fact, research also shows that customers are willing to switch manufacturers just to be able to use mobile devices and connectivity. In 2014 there were 21% who were willing to do so whereas in 2015 this number climbed up to 37%. On top of that 32% of those customers would also be ready to pay for a service related to connectivity on top on a base model. This figure has been at 21% in 2014, one year before. The increase of customers willing to switch manufacturers and to pay for such services shows the increase in importance for connected cars.

The Internet of Things will be used to provide mobile services in the car with high-speed Internet. This feature will enable real time traffic control, interaction with the car manufacturer service for remote diagnostics and improved company logistics automation. Moreover, in the beginning of the self-driven car era, internet will be used for information exchange between the cars for better route selection and accident reports.

== Criticism ==
=== Drawbacks and challenges ===
Although the connected car offers both benefits and excitement to the drivers, it also faces drawbacks and challenges;

- A major issue with the connected cars is hackability. The more it is connected to the Internet and to the system, it becomes more exposed to being penetrated from the outside. If the service and help can be provided from distance by car-makers, through that channel, hackers can access and control the car as well. In Germany and Brazil, 59% of car drivers are afraid to be hacked into their car if it is connected to the Internet. In the U.S there are 43% and in China 53% whereas the average lies at 54%.
- Reliability is also a major concern. Cars, sensor, and network hardware will malfunction. The system has to deal with incorrect data, as well as faulty communications, such as denial of service attacks.
- Privacy is another dimension, both with hacking and with other uses. Sensitive data gathered from the car such as the location, driver's daily route, apps that are used, etc. are all susceptible to be hacked and used for unauthorised purposes, as well as being used by businesses and government. In Germany for example 51% of car drivers do not want to use car-related connected services because they want to keep their privacy. In the U.S. it is 45%, in Brazil 37% and in China 21% of the car drivers that think so. The average lies at 37%.
- A simple failure in the system, whether in the connected car, or elsewhere in the network, while on the autonomous drive can cause fatal consequences.

=== Fighting the challenges ===
- Changing the design of products: the way that the product is developed and the "maintenance-respond-architecture" play a crucial role. Companies have to focus on long-term solutions in terms of design security because quick changes are costly and easy to circumvent. Integrating this sphere at the earliest stage possible when developing the product can be the right approach for the companies.
- Internal cooperation between departments of the company: product-security teams and corporate IT-security teams will have to work closely together in order to prevent the hackability of their devices. To do so, companies may create guidelines that minimize probabilities of bugs, and security gaps (software). Making modifying and patching systems easier can be another effect driven from that.
- Over-the-air updates: As short-term solutions are also easy to solve problems a technology called OTA (over-the-air) becomes more and more important to OEMs. These OTA updates allow companies to quickly detect problems/attacks and prevent the malefactors to become active and attack the system. However, this is a very costly approach and companies have to know the architecture of their systems in detail to directly attack the issue not to lose money on inefficiency.
- Value chain security: As companies are the final integrators of security systems they also have to control security all along the value chain. Also suppliers have to make sure that security plays the most important role for the mobile device. Taking the example of the procurement department, it has to make sure that the cybersecurity features of the final product are negotiated and available. The whole security issue starts at the beginning of the value chain. This approach can be used to actually define and shape future security standards in the industry and make sure that every player in the industry has the same understanding of the importance of security.

== Connected car service features ==
- Mobile App Service

| Manufacturer | Service | Mobile App | Features (Compatible based on model) | Safety Service | Security Service |
|---|---|---|---|---|---|
| Audi | myAudi | Yes | Start / Stop Lock / Unlock Climate Controls | | |
| Acura | AcuraLink | Yes | Start / Stop Lock / Unlock Climate Controls | | |
| BMW | Connected Drive | Yes | Start / Stop Lock / Unlock Climate Controls | | |
| Cadillac | myCadillac | Yes | TBD | | |
| Chevrolet | myChevrolet | Yes | TBD | | |
| Chrysler | Uconnect Access | Yes | TBD | SafetyCloud | |
| Dodge | Uconnect Access | Yes | TBD | | |
| Fiat | Uconnect Access | Yes | TBD | | |
| Ford | SYNC Connect | Yes | Start / Stop Lock / Unlock | | |
| Genesis | GENESIS connected services | Yes | Start / Stop Lock / Unlock Climate Controls Horn Honk & Light Vehicle Status Check Find My Car Location Share My Car (APP Sharing) Tyre Pressure Information Seat Ventilation Control / Status Air Purifier ON Fuel Level Information In-Vehicle Air Quality Status Pro-Active Vehicle Status Alert Auto/Manual DTC Check (Diagnosis) Monthly Health Report Maintenance Alert Driving Information / Behaviour Digital Car Key Car Pay(In-vehicle Payment) IoT(CarToHome/HomeToCar) | Auto Crash Notification (ACN) SOS / Emergency Assistance Road Side Assistance Panic Notification | Stolen Vehicle Tracking Stolen Vehicle Notification Stolen Vehicle Immobilization |
| GMC | myGMC | Yes | TBD | | |
| Honda | HondaLink | Yes | Start / Stop Lock / Unlock Climate Controls | | |
| Hyundai | Blue Link | Yes | Start / Stop Lock / Unlock Climate Controls Horn Honk & Light Vehicle Status Check Find My Car Location Share My Car (APP Sharing) Tyre Pressure Information Seat Ventilation Control / Status Air Purifier ON Fuel Level Information In-Vehicle Air Quality Status Pro-Active Vehicle Status Alert Auto/Manual DTC Check (Diagnosis) Monthly Health Report Maintenance Alert Driving Information / Behaviour Digital Car Key Car Pay(In-vehicle Payment) IoT(CarToHome/HomeToCar) | Auto Crash Notification (ACN) SOS / Emergency Assistance Road Side Assistance Panic Notification | Stolen Vehicle Tracking Stolen Vehicle Notification Stolen Vehicle Immobilization |
| Jeep | Uconnect Access | Yes | TBD | | |
| Kia | Kia Connect | Yes | Start / Stop Lock / Unlock Climate Controls Horn Honk & Light Vehicle Status Check Find My Car Location Share My Car (APP Sharing) Tyre Pressure Information Seat Ventilation Control / Status Air Purifier ON Fuel Level Information In-Vehicle Air Quality Status Pro-Active Vehicle Status Alert Auto/Manual DTC Check (Diagnosis) Monthly Health Report Maintenance Alert Driving Information / Behaviour Digital Car Key Car Pay(In-vehicle Payment) IoT(CarToHome/HomeToCar) | Auto Crash Notification (ACN) SOS / Emergency Assistance Road Side Assistance Panic Notification | Stolen Vehicle Tracking Stolen Vehicle Notification Stolen Vehicle Immobilization |
| Lexus | Lexus Enform Remote | Yes | TBD | | |
| Mazda | Mazda Mobile Start | Yes | TBD | | |
| Mercedes | mbrace | Yes | Start / Stop Lock / Unlock Climate Controls | | |
| Mitsubishi | Mitsubishi Connect | No | TBD | | |
| Nissan | NissanConnect | Yes | TBD | | |
| RAM | Uconnect Access | Yes | TBD | | |
| Subaru | STARLINK | Yes | Lock / Unlock | | |
| Tesla | Tesla | Yes | Start / Stop Lock / Unlock Climate Controls | | |
| Toyota | Toyota Remote Connect | Yes | Start / Stop Lock / Unlock | | |
| Volvo | Volvo On Call | Yes | Start / Stop Lock / Unlock Climate Controls | | |
| Volkswagen | Car-Net | Yes | TBD | | |

== See also ==
- Car hacking
- IEEE 802.11p
- Self-driving car
- Smartcar, Inc.
- Software update system
- Vehicle-to-everything
- Vehicle-to-vehicle
