= Noventi Health =

Healthcare technical services company group

NOVENTI
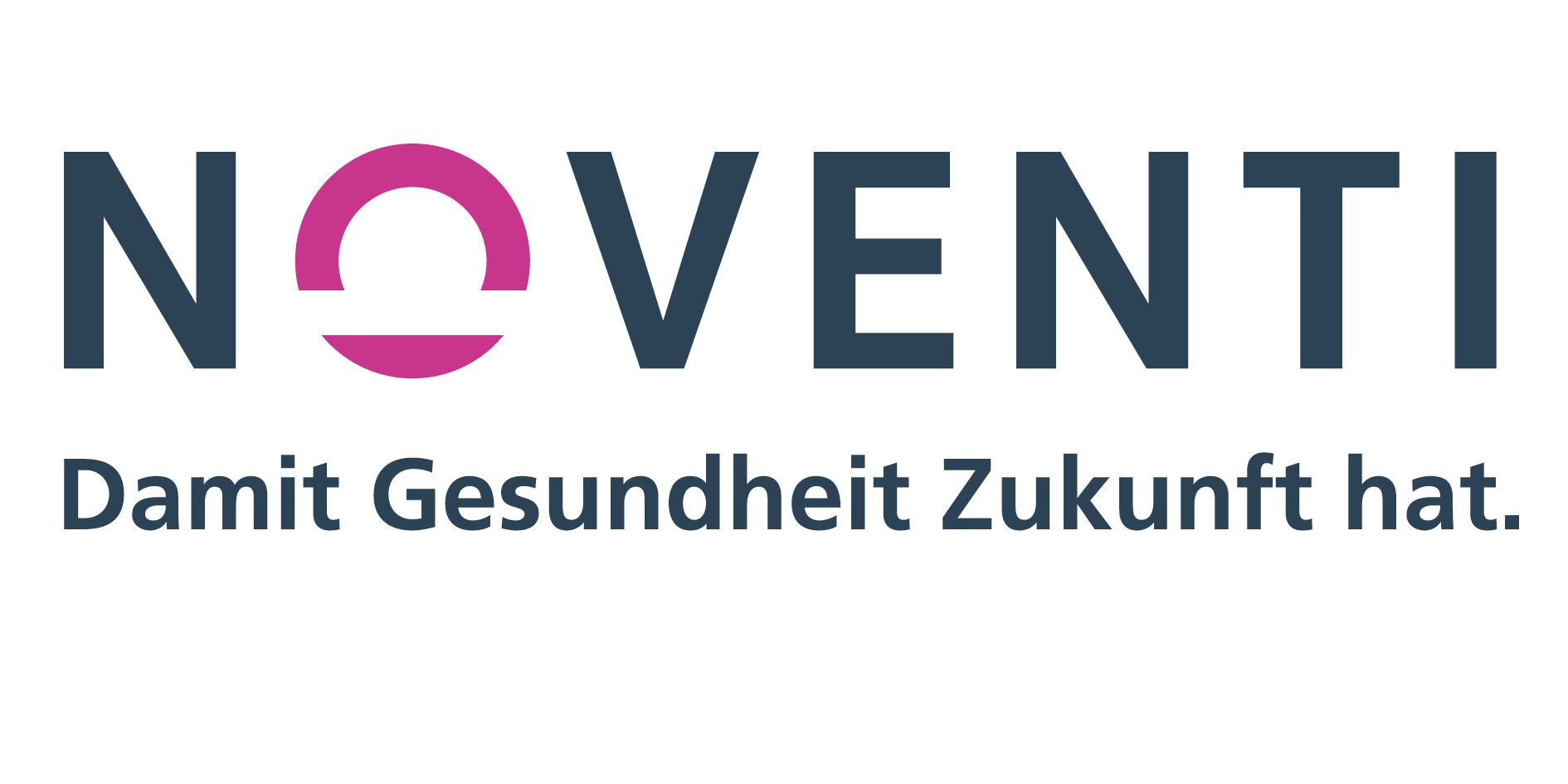
- Type: Societas Europaea
- Industry: Health
- Founded: 1900
- Founder: Verein der Apotheker Münchens e.V. (Association of Munich Pharmacists)
- Headquarters: Munich, Germany
- Key people: Mark Böhm Frank Steimel Holger Wessling
- Revenue: 256 Mio. Euro (2025)
- Number of employees: approx. 1700
- Website: www.noventi.de

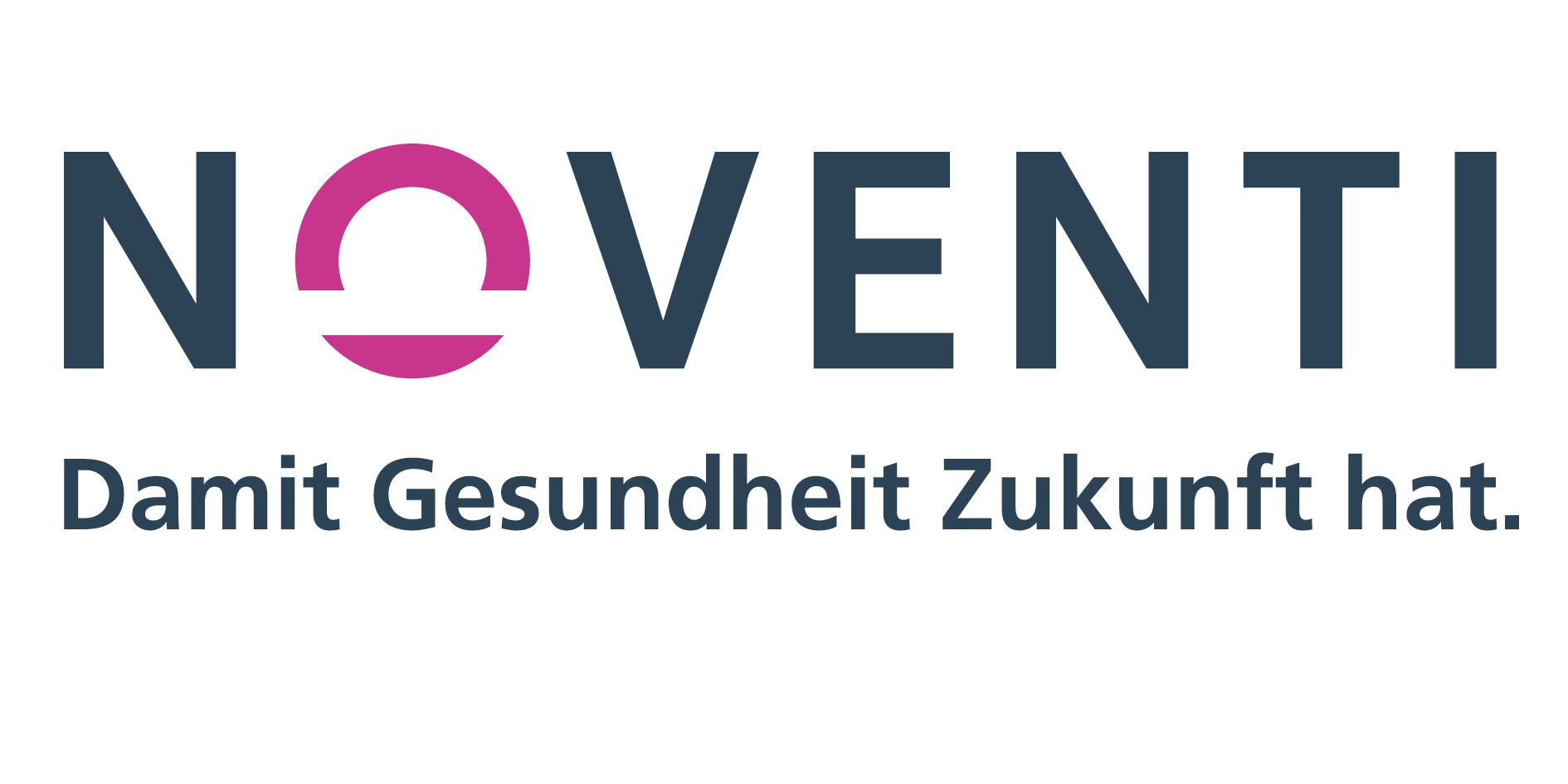
NOVENTI logo

NOVENTI is a 100 percent pharmacy-owned group of companies headquartered in Munich. It offers software, hardware, financial services and digital platforms for healthcare providers in the European healthcare market. The software and finance company's business revenue totaled 256 Mio. Euro in 2025

== History ==
The company was founded in 1900 by the Verein der Apotheker Münchens e.V. (Association of Munich Pharmacists) as an interest group for local pharmacies, transformed in 1967 into Verrechnungsstelle der Bayerischen Apotheken e.V. (VBA) and in 1971 into VSA Verrechnungsstelle der Süddeutschen Apotheker e.V. In 1983, the billing business was outsourced to VSA GmbH; VSA e.V. changed its name to FSA e.V., which is still the sole shareholder of NOVENTI.

In the 1990s, NOVENTI's core business, at that time billing for inpatient pharmacies, was expanded through strategic acquisitions and by adding the Other Service Providers business area. In 2014, Noventi entered the care sector with a majority stake in Noventi Care GmbH.

In 2016, NOVENTI restructured into a holding company with 27 subsidiaries and strategic investments within Europe, distributed across the umbrella companies Noventi Health SE, Noventi HealthCare GmbH and Noventi GmbH. The sole shareholder continues to be FSA e.V., which helps shape the holding company's development and entrepreneurial decisions via the supervisory board.

== Products and Services ==
The subsidiaries of NOVENTI primarily focus on providing services, notably including prescription billing, logistics, and software solutions such as ERP systems tailored to healthcare providers, including pharmacies. NOVENTI stands as Germany's largest provider of ERP systems, with an annual processing volume of approximately 200 million paper prescriptions, representing nearly half of the nation's total medical prescriptions. In the fiscal year 2021, gross prescription sales surpassed 30 billion euros. Moreover, Noventi HealthCare GmbH extends its offerings to encompass financial services tailored to healthcare providers, in addition to merchandise management and prescription billing.

The holding company, along with its strategic investments and subsidiary entities, actively engages in the development and deployment of IT solutions to support customers in their digital transformation endeavors. Noventi HealthCare undertook software development tasks as part of the GERDA pilot project - an ePrescription initiative. In 2019, NOVENTI completed Germany's inaugural ePrescription billing via the GERDA pilot project. Furthermore, NOVENTI contributes to the integration of German pharmacies into the requisite telematics infrastructure (TI) for ePrescription implementation, offering its own TI equipment package.

Expanding its collaborative efforts, in 2021, NOVENTI established a joint venture with pharmaceutical wholesaler Phoenix to jointly operate the health portal gesund.de.

In September 2022, NOVENTI restructured its executive board; under Mark Böhm and Frank Steimel, the company launched the "Focus 2025" program, through which it concentrated on the business areas of billing, merchandise management, and industry software. In 2023, NOVENTI was voted "Germany's best billing center" by German pharmacists. In connection with the mandatory, nationwide introduction of the e-prescription from 2024 onward, NOVENTI reported that it processed approximately 171 million e-prescriptions, corresponding to roughly one third of all e-prescriptions issued in Germany. According to its own statements, NOVENTI aims to achieve a leading market position not only in prescription billing but also in the areas of merchandise management and industry software, among other things through the expansion of existing products as well as increased automation and process management. With the publication of its 2025 annual financial statements, NOVENTI declared the company's multi-year restructuring process complete.
