= V2V =

V2V or vehicle to vehicle may refer to:

- communication: Vehicle-to-everything (V2X) or Vehicular ad hoc network intervehicle communication
- power exchange between battery electric vehicles as a special case of Vehicle-to-load (V2L)
