= Communication source =

Sender of a communication

A source or sender is one of the basic concepts of communication and information processing. Sources are objects which encode message data and transmit the information, via a channel, to one or more observers (or receivers).

In the strictest sense of the word, particularly in information theory, a source is a process that generates message data that one would like to communicate, or reproduce as exactly as possible elsewhere in space or time. A source may be modelled as memoryless, ergodic, stationary, or stochastic, in order of increasing generality.

Communication Source combines Communication and Mass Media Complete and Communication Abstracts to provide full-text access to more than 700 journals, and indexing and abstracting for more than 1,000 core journals. Coverage dating goes back to 1900.

Content is derived from academic journals, conference papers, conference proceedings, trade publications, magazines and periodicals.

A transmitter can be either a device, for example, an antenna, or a human transmitter, for example, a speaker. The word "transmitter" derives from an emitter, that is to say, that emits using the Hertzian waves.

In sending mail it also refers to the person or organization that sends a letter and whose address is written on the envelope of the letter.

In finance, an issuer can be, for example, the bank system of elements.

In education, an issuer is any person or thing that gives knowledge to the student, for example, the professor.

For communication to be effective, the sender and receiver must share the same code. In ordinary communication, the sender and receiver roles are usually interchangeable.

Depending on the language's functions, the issuer fulfills the expressive or emotional function, in which feelings, emotions, and opinions are manifested, such as The way is dangerous.

== In economy ==
In the economy, the issuer is a legal entity, foundation, company, individual firm, national or foreign governments, investment companies or others that develop, register and then trade commercial securities to finance their operations. The issuers are legally responsible for the issues in question and for reporting the financial conditions, materials developed and whatever their operational activities required by the regulations within their jurisdictions.

== See also ==
- CALM M5
