= Nocpix =

Thermal product manufacturer

- Company type: Private
- Industry: Thermal imaging
- Products: Thermals and night vision equipment
- Owner: Inlumen Technologies
- Website: www.nocpix.com

Nocpix is a thermal product manufacturer owned by Inlumen Technologies. The brand's name is a fusion of the words "nocturnal" and "pixel". It focuses on the production of thermal monoculars, binoculars, and scopes. The ACE S60R is one of Nocpix's representative products. Its thermals are suitable for fox hunting and vermin control. The brand developed the Reality+ and Vision+ systems. It also owns and operates the Nocpix app.

Nocpix specializes in the manufacture of thermal rifle scopes. The brand's main products include the Quest, Lumi, and Bolt series. In February 2025, it attended the British Shooting Show. In July, it was included in the MENA Report. In November of the same year, it participated in the Middle East Hunting Expo. Currently, Nocpix's products are available in Europe, such as the UK, French, and Latvia.

== History ==
Nocpix was initially launched specifically for hunters. In September 2024, the brand introduced thermal products for hunting and outdoor use. In January 2025, it took part in the SHOT Show.

In February 2025, Nocpix developed a D2D communication system named N-Link. By August, its products had become available in New Zealand. In October, it rolled out the RICO 2 Series of thermal weapon sights.
