= D2D =

D2D may refer to:

== Technology ==
- Direct-to-disc, the release of a film or television series on any kind of hard copy formats for strictly private residential viewing
- Device-to-device, proximity-based direct communications between mobile nodes orchestrated by the cellular operator
- Direct2D, a hardware-accelerated 2D API built on top of Direct3D 10
- Direct2Drive, an online video game and entertainment distributor and retail store

== Other uses ==
- Door-to-door, a sales or political technique for engaging an audience
- Dot to Dot Festival, a music festival in the United Kingdom
- Delhi 2 Dublin, a Canadian world music band
