= Vehicular ad hoc network =

Type of inter-vehicle communication network

A vehicular ad hoc network (VANET) is a proposed type of mobile ad hoc network (MANET) involving road vehicles. VANETs were first proposed in 2001 as "car-to-car ad-hoc mobile communication and networking" applications, where networks could be formed and information could be relayed among cars. It has been shown that vehicle-to-vehicle and vehicle-to-roadside communications architectures could co-exist in VANETs to provide road safety, navigation, and other roadside services. VANETs could be a key part of the intelligent transportation systems (ITS) framework. Sometimes, VANETs are referred to as Intelligent Transportation Networks. They could evolve into a broader "Internet of vehicles". which itself could evolve into an "Internet of autonomous vehicles".

While, in the early 2000s, VANETs were seen as a mere one-to-one application of MANET principles, they have since then developed into a field of research in their own right. By 2015, the term VANET became mostly synonymous with the more generic term inter-vehicle communication (IVC), although the focus remains on the aspect of spontaneous networking, much less on the use of infrastructure like Road Side Units (RSUs) or cellular networks.

VANETs are in development and are not in use by commercially available vehicles.

== Applications ==
VANETs could support a wide range of applications – from simple one hop information dissemination of, e.g., cooperative awareness messages (CAMs) to multi-hop dissemination of messages over vast distances. Most of the principles of mobile ad hoc networks (MANETs) apply to VANETs, but the details differ. Rather than moving at random, vehicles tend to move in an organized fashion. The interactions with roadside equipment can likewise be characterized fairly accurately. And finally, most vehicles are restricted in their range of motion, for example by being constrained to follow a paved highway.

Potential applications of VANETs include:

- Electronic brake lights, which would allow a driver (or an autonomous car or truck) to react to vehicles braking even though they might be obscured (e.g., by other vehicles).
- Platooning, which would allow vehicles to closely (down to a few inches) follow a leading vehicle by wirelessly receiving acceleration and steering information, thus forming electronically coupled "road trains".
- Traffic information systems, which would use VANET communication to provide up-to-the minute obstacle reports to a vehicle's satellite navigation system
- Road Transportation Emergency Services – where VANET communications, VANET networks, and road safety warning and status information dissemination would be used to reduce delays and speed up emergency rescue operations to save the lives of those injured.
- On-The-Road Services – it is also envisioned that the future transportation highway would be "information-driven" or "wirelessly-enabled". VANETs can help advertise services (shops, gas stations, restaurants, etc.) to the driver, and even send notifications of any sale going on at that moment.
- Electronic Toll Collection – The tolling application performed with the C-ITS equipment. These latter use the ITS-G5 technology, the Roadside Unit (RSU) and the on-board unit (OBU) with features specified by the standardization Institute ETSI. To perform this service, we highlight two mains requirements: how to have a reliable geolocation of the vehicle when it crosses the tollgate and how to secure the communication during the transaction process.

== Technology ==
VANETs could use any wireless networking technology as their basis. The most prominent are short-range radio technologies are WLAN and DSRC. In addition, cellular technologies or LTE and 5G can be used for VANETs.

== Simulations ==
Prior to the implementation of VANETs on the roads, realistic computer simulations of VANETs using a combination of Urban Mobility simulation and Network simulation are thought to be necessary. Typically open source simulator like SUMO (which handles road traffic simulation) is combined with a network simulator like TETCOS NetSim, or NS-2 to study the performance of VANETs. Further simulations could also be done for communication channel modeling that captures the complexities of wireless network for VANETs.

== Standards ==
Major standardization of VANET protocol stacks is taking place in the U.S., in Europe, and in Japan, corresponding to these regions' dominance in the automotive industry.

In the U.S., the IEEE 1609 WAVE Wireless Access in Vehicular Environments protocol stack builds on IEEE 802.11p WLAN operating on seven reserved channels in the 5.9 GHz frequency band. The WAVE protocol stack is designed to provide multi-channel operation (even for vehicles equipped with only a single radio), security, and lightweight application layer protocols. Within the IEEE Communications Society, there is a Technical Subcommittee on Vehicular Networks & Telematics Applications (VNTA). The charter of this committee is to actively promote technical activities in the field of vehicular networks, V2V, V2R and V2I communications, standards, communications-enabled road and vehicle safety, real-time traffic monitoring, intersection management technologies, future telematics applications, and ITS-based services.

== Radio frequencies ==
In the US, the systems could use a region of the 5.9 GHz band set aside by the United States Congress, the unlicensed frequency also used by Wi-Fi. The US V2V standard, commonly known as WAVE ("Wireless Access for Vehicular Environments"), builds upon the lower-level IEEE 802.11p standard, as early as 2004.

The European Commission Decision 2008/671/EC harmonises the use of the 5 875-5 905 MHz frequency band for transport safety ITS applications. In Europe V2V is standardised as ETSI ITS, a standard also based on IEEE 802.11p. C-ITS, cooperative ITS, is also a term used in EU policy making, closely linked to ITS-G5 and V2V.

V2V is also known as VANET (vehicular ad hoc network). It is a variation of MANET (Mobile ad hoc network), with the emphasis being now the node is the vehicle. In 2001, it was mentioned in a publication that ad hoc networks can be formed by cars and such networks can help overcome blind spots, avoid accidents, etc. The infrastructure also participates in such systems, then referred to as V2X (vehicle-to-everything). Over the years, there have been considerable research and projects in this area, applying VANETs for a variety of applications, ranging from safety to navigation and law enforcement.

In 1999 the US Federal Communications Commission (FCC) allocated 75 MHz in the spectrum of 5.850-5.925 GHz for intelligent transport systems.

=== Conflict over spectrum ===
As of 2016, V2V is under threat from cable television and other tech firms that want to take away a big chunk of the radio spectrum currently reserved for it and use those frequencies for high-speed internet service. V2V's current share of spectrum was set aside by the government in 1999. The auto industry is trying to retain all it can saying that it desperately needs the spectrum for V2V. The Federal Communications Commission has taken the side of the tech companies with the National Traffic Safety Board supporting the position of the auto industry. Internet service providers who want the spectrum claim that self-driving cars will make extensive use of V2V unnecessary. The auto industry said it is willing to share the spectrum if V2V service is not slowed or disrupted; the FCC plans to test several sharing schemes.

== Research ==
Research in VANETs started as early as 2000, in universities and research labs, having evolved from researchers working on wireless ad hoc networks. Many have worked on media access protocols, routing, warning message dissemination, and VANET application scenarios. V2V is currently in active development by General Motors, which demonstrated the system in 2006 using Cadillac vehicles. Other automakers working on V2V include Toyota, BMW, Daimler, Honda, Audi, Volvo and the Car-to-Car communication consortium.

== Regulation ==
Since then, the United States Department of Transportation (USDOT) has been working with a range of stakeholders on V2X. In 2012, a pre-deployment project was implemented in Ann Arbor, Michigan. 2800 vehicles covering cars, motorcycles, buses and HGV of different brands took part using equipment by different manufacturers. The US National Highway Traffic Safety Administration (NHTSA) saw this model deployment as proof that road safety could be improved and that WAVE standard technology was interoperable. In August 2014, NHTSA published a report arguing vehicle-to-vehicle technology was technically proven as ready for deployment. In April 2014 it was reported that U.S. regulators were close to approving V2V standards for the U.S. market. On 20 August 2014 the NHTSA published an Advance Notice of Proposed Rulemaking (ANPRM) in the Federal Register, arguing that the safety benefits of V2X communication could only be achieved, if a significant part of the vehicles fleet was equipped. Because of the lacking immediate benefit for early adopters the NHTSA proposed a mandatory introduction. On 25 June 2015, the US House of Representatives held a hearing on the matter, where again the NHTSA, as well as other stakeholders argued the case for V2X.

In the EU the ITS Directive 2010/40/EU was adopted in 2010. It aims to assure that ITS applications are interoperable and can operate across national borders, it defines priority areas for secondary legislation, which cover V2X and requires technologies to be mature. In 2014 the European Commission's industry stakeholder "C-ITS Deployment Platform" started working on a regulatory framework for V2X in the EU. It identified key approaches to an EU-wide V2X security Public Key infrastructure (PKI) and data protection, as well as facilitating a mitigation standard to prevent radio interference between ITS-G5 based V2X and CEN DSRC-based road charging systems. The European Commission recognised ITS-G5 as the initial communication technology in its 5G Action Plan and the accompanying explanatory document, to form a communication environment consisting of ITS-G5 and cellular communication as envisioned by EU Member States. Various pre-deployment projects exist at EU or EU Member State level, such as SCOOP@F, the Testfeld Telematik, the digital testbed Autobahn, the Rotterdam-Vienna ITS Corridor, Nordic Way, COMPASS4D or C-ROADS. Further projects are under preparation.

== VANET in urban scenarios ==
While using VANET in urban scenarios there are some aspects that are important to take in count. The first one is the analysis of the idle time and the choosing of a routing protocol that satisfy the specifications of our network. The other one is to try to minimize the data download time by choosing the right network architecture after analyzing the urban scenario where we want to implement it.

== See also ==
- Connected car
- Intelligent vehicular ad hoc network
- Mobile ad hoc network
- Network Simulator
- Vehicle-to-everything
- Vehicular communication systems
- Wireless ad hoc network
- Device-to-device
