= VRR =

VRR may refer to:

- Variable refresh rate, displays that support a dynamic refresh rate
- Vehicular Reactive Routing protocol
- Voters Registration Record, a process of voter registration in the Philippines
- Verkehrsverbund Rhein-Ruhr, a public transport association in Germany
