= CALM M5 =

CALM M5 is the ISO 21215 standard that incorporates WAVE (WAVE PHY/MAC is IEEE 802.11p standard) and adds the following features:

- Global (European) 5 GHz spectrum
- Regulatory domain (border) management
- Directivity and EMC control
- Regional DSRC cooperation
- Multiple radios/interfaces/antenna management through network connection
- GPRS/UMTS/+++ network interconnectivity

== See also ==
- IEEE 802.11p
