= V2X =

V2X can mean:

- Vehicle-to-X power transfer: umbrella term for vehicle-to-grid bidirectional charging for/from electric vehicles
- Vehicle-to-everything communication systems.
- A trading name for the Vectrus company
