= Automotive security =

Branch of computer security related to the automotive context

Automotive security refers to the branch of computer security focused on the cyber risks related to the automotive context. The increasingly high number of ECUs in vehicles and, alongside, the implementation of multiple different means of communication from and towards the vehicle in a remote and wireless manner led to the necessity of a branch of cybersecurity dedicated to the threats associated with vehicles. Not to be confused with automotive safety.

== Causes ==
The implementation of multiple ECUs (Electronic Control Units) inside vehicles began in the early '70s thanks to the development of integrated circuits and microprocessors that made it economically feasible to produce the ECUs on a large scale. Since then the number of ECUs has increased to up to 100 per vehicle. These units nowadays control almost everything in the vehicle, from simple tasks such as activating the wipers to more safety-related ones like brake-by-wire or ABS (Anti-lock Braking System). Autonomous driving is also strongly reliant on the implementation of new, complex ECUs such as the ADAS, alongside sensors (lidars and radars) and their control units.

Inside the vehicle, the ECUs are connected with each other through cabled or wireless communication networks, such as CAN bus (controller area network), MOST bus (Media Oriented System Transport), FlexRay (Automotive Network Communications Protocol) or RF (radio frequency) as in many implementations of TPMSs (tire-pressure monitoring systems). Many of these ECUs require data received through these networks that arrive from various sensors to operate and use such data to modify the behavior of the vehicle (e.g., the cruise control modifies the vehicle's speed depending on signals arriving from a button usually located on the steering wheel).

Since the development of cheap wireless communication technologies such as Bluetooth, LTE, Wi-Fi, RFID and similar, automotive producers and OEMs have designed ECUs that implement such technologies with the goal of improving the experience of the driver and passengers. Safety-related systems such as the OnStar from General Motors, telematic units, communication between smartphones and the vehicle's speakers through Bluetooth, Android Auto and Apple CarPlay.

== Threat model ==
Threat models of the automotive world are based on both real-world and theoretically possible attacks. Most real-world attacks aim at the safety of the people in and around the car, by modifying the cyber-physical capabilities of the vehicle (e.g., steering, braking, accelerating without requiring actions from the driver), while theoretical attacks have been supposed to focus also on privacy-related goals, such as obtaining GPS data on the vehicle, or capturing microphone signals and similar.

Regarding the attack surfaces of the vehicle, they are usually divided in long-range, short-range, and local attack surfaces: LTE and DSRC can be considered long-range ones, while Bluetooth and Wi-Fi are usually considered short-range although still wireless. Finally, USB, OBD-II and all the attack surfaces that require physical access to the car are defined as local. An attacker that is able to implement the attack through a long-range surface is considered stronger and more dangerous than the one that requires physical access to the vehicle. In 2015 the possibility of attacks on vehicles already on the market has been proven possible by Miller and Valasek, that managed to disrupt the driving of a Jeep Cherokee while remotely connecting to it through remote wireless communication.

=== CAN bus attacks ===
The most common network used in vehicles and the one that is mainly used for safety-related communication is CAN, due to its real-time properties, simplicity, and cheapness. For this reason the majority of real-world attacks have been implemented against ECUs connected through this type of network.

The majority of attacks demonstrated either against actual vehicles or in testbeds fall in one or more of the following categories:

==== Sniffing ====
Sniffing in the computer security field generally refers to the possibility of intercepting and logging packets or more generally data from a network. In the case of CAN, since it is a bus network, every node listens to all communication on the network. It is useful for the attacker to read data to learn the behavior of the other nodes of the network before implementing the actual attack. Usually, the final goal of the attacker is not to simply sniff the data on CAN, since the packets passing on this type of network are not usually valuable just to read.

==== Denial of service ====
Denial of service (DoS) in information security is usually described as an attack that has the objective of making a machine or a network unavailable. DoS attacks against ECUs connected to CAN buses can be done both against the network, by abusing the arbitration protocol used by CAN to always win the arbitration, and targeting the single ECU, by abusing the error handling protocol of CAN. In this second case the attacker flags the messages of the victim as faulty to convince the victim of being broken and therefore shut itself off the network.

==== Spoofing ====
Spoofing attacks comprise all cases in which an attacker, by falsifying data, sends messages pretending to be another node of the network. In automotive security usually spoofing attacks are divided into masquerade and replay attacks. Replay attacks are defined as all those where the attacker pretends to be the victim and sends sniffed data that the victim sent in a previous iteration of authentication. Masquerade attacks are, on the contrary, spoofing attacks where the data payload has been created by the attacker.

== Real life automotive threat example ==
Security researchers Charlie Miller and Chris Valasek have successfully demonstrated remote access to a wide variety of vehicle controls using a Jeep Cherokee as the target. They were able to control the radio, environmental controls, windshield wipers, and certain engine and brake functions.

The method used to hack the system was implementation of pre-programmed chip into the controller area network (CAN) bus. By inserting this chip into the CAN bus, he was able to send arbitrary message to CAN bus. One other thing that Miller has pointed out is the danger of the CAN bus, as it broadcasts the signal which the message can be caught by the hackers throughout the network.

The control of the vehicle was all done remotely, manipulating the system without any physical interaction. Miller states that he could control any of some 1.4 million vehicles in the United States regardless of the location or distance, the only thing needed is for someone to turn on the vehicle to gain access.

The work by Miller and Valasek replicated earlier work completed and published by academics in 2010 and 2011 on a different vehicle. The earlier work demonstrated the ability to compromise a vehicle remotely, over multiple wireless channels (including cellular), and the ability to remotely control critical components on the vehicle post-compromise, including the telematics unit and the car's brakes. While the earlier academic work was publicly visible, both in peer-reviewed scholarly publications and in the press, the Miller and Valesek work received even greater public visibility.

== Security measures ==
The increasing complexity of devices and networks in the automotive context requires the application of security measures to limit the capabilities of a potential attacker. Since the early 2000 many different countermeasures have been proposed and, in some cases, applied. Following, a list of the most common security measures:

- Sub-networks: to limit the attacker capabilities even if he/she manages to access the vehicle from remote through a remotely connected ECU, the networks of the vehicle are divided in multiple sub-networks, and the most critical ECUs are not placed in the same sub-networks of the ECUs that can be accessed from remote.
- Gateways: the sub-networks are divided by secure gateways or firewalls that block messages from crossing from a sub-network to the other if they were not intended to.
- Intrusion Detection Systems (IDS): on each critical sub-network, one of the nodes (ECUs) connected to it has the goal of reading all data passing on the sub-network and detect messages that, given some rules, are considered malicious (made by an attacker). The arbitrary messages can be caught by the passenger by using IDS which will notify the owner regarding with unexpected message.
- Authentication protocols: in order to implement authentication on networks where it is not already implemented (such as CAN), it is possible to design an authentication protocol that works on the higher layers of the ISO OSI model, by using part of the data payload of a message to authenticate the message itself.
- Hardware Security Modules: since many ECUs are not powerful enough to keep real-time delays while executing encryption or decryption routines, between the ECU and the network it is possible to place a hardware security module that manages security for it.
- Intrusion Detection and IT-forensic Measures: reactive measures that address basic weaknesses.
- The U.S. National Highway Traffic Safety Administration recommends a layered approach to vehicle cybersecurity. Its guidance includes prioritizing protection of safety-critical vehicle control systems, rapidly detecting and responding to cybersecurity incidents, designing systems for cyber resilience and recovery, and sharing cybersecurity information across the automotive industry.

== Legislation ==
In June 2020, the United Nations Economic Commission for Europe (UNECE) World Forum for Harmonization of Vehicle Regulations released two new regulations, R155 and R156, establishing "clear performance and audit requirements for car manufacturers" in terms of automotive cybersecurity and software updates.
