= Communications Access for Land Mobiles =

Communications access for land mobiles (CALM) is an initiative by the ISO TC 204/Working Group 16 to define a set of wireless communication protocols and air interfaces for a variety of communication scenarios spanning multiple modes of communications and multiple methods of transmissions in Intelligent Transportation System (ITS). The CALM architecture is based on an IPv6 convergence layer that decouples applications from the communication infrastructure. A standardized set of air interface protocols is provided for the best use of resources available for short, medium and long-range, safety critical communications, using one or more of several media, with multipoint (mesh) transfer.

Since 2007 CALM stands for Communication Access for Land Mobile, before that year, CALM stood for Communications, Air-interface, Long and Medium range.

== Communication Modes ==
CALM enables the following communication modes:

- Vehicle-to-Infrastructure (V2I): communication initiated by either roadside or vehicle (e.g. petrol forecourt or toll booth)
- Vehicle-to-Vehicle (V2V): peer to peer ad hoc networking amongst fast moving objects following the idea of MANET's/VANET's.
- Infrastructure-to-Infrastructure (I2I): point-to-point connection where conventional cabling is undesirable (e.g. using lamp posts or street signs to relay signals)

Methods of transmission used by CALM may be based on one or more of the following communication media:

- Infrared
- GSM (2G, 3G cellular telephone communication technology)
- DSRC 5.8-5.9 GHz (legacy systems)
- Various evolutions of the IEEE 802.11 standard including WAVE (IEEE P1609.3/D23), M5 (ISO 21215)
- WiMAX, IEEE 802.16e
- MM-wave (63 GHz)
- Satellite
- Bluetooth
- RFID

The CALM architecture provides an abstraction layer for vehicle applications, managing communication for multiple concurrent sessions spanning all communications modes, and all methods of transmission.

== Applications ==
Applications for CALM are likely to include in-vehicle internet access, dynamic navigation, safety warnings, collision avoidance, and ad hoc networks linking multiple vehicles.

== Security ==
The CALM architecture protects critical in-vehicle communication using a firewall controlled by the vehicle. Parental controls are also being considered as a component of the architecture.

== Implementations ==
The CALM standard is still work in progress. Therefore, large scale implementations of the standard do not yet exist. CVIS is a project funded by the EC in the sixth framework program (FP6). The aim of the project is to develop and implement a communication infrastructure based on the CALM architecture. CVIS will implement CALM M5, 2G/3G and IR as communication media. The implementation will be tested at several test locations across Europe with a wide range of ITS applications.
