= Cooperative Intelligent Transport System =

Vehicle-to-anything communication system

The Cooperative Intelligent Transport System (C-ITS) enables vehicles to inform each other about traffic and, in particular, dangerous situations. When a vehicle with its sensors detects a state important for other road users, such as obstacles, traffic jams, black ice, or aquaplaning, then it provides this observation via data exchange. Vehicles may also exchange messages with road furniture such as signals and road signs.

C-ITS is envisaged to launch in three phases; in the first, it will be used to transmit warnings; in the second, communication between devices will be used to combine data to issue warnings, and in the third, vehicles will cooperate to coordindate their behavior. The vehicles can thus react in a coordinated manner to an event, for example to dodge an obstacle or brake.

As of 2025, C-ITS was being experimentally deployed in several countries. Multiple countries have plans to deploy C-ITS, including Austria, Czechia, Germany, Italy and Spain.

== Technology ==
C-ITS is a vehicle-to-everything (V2X) system based on the IEEE 802.11p vehicle to vehicle wireless local area network standard. The protocols used between C-ITS participants are defined in a suite of standards documents defined by ISO and CEN.
