= Cellular V2X =

Standard for V2X applications

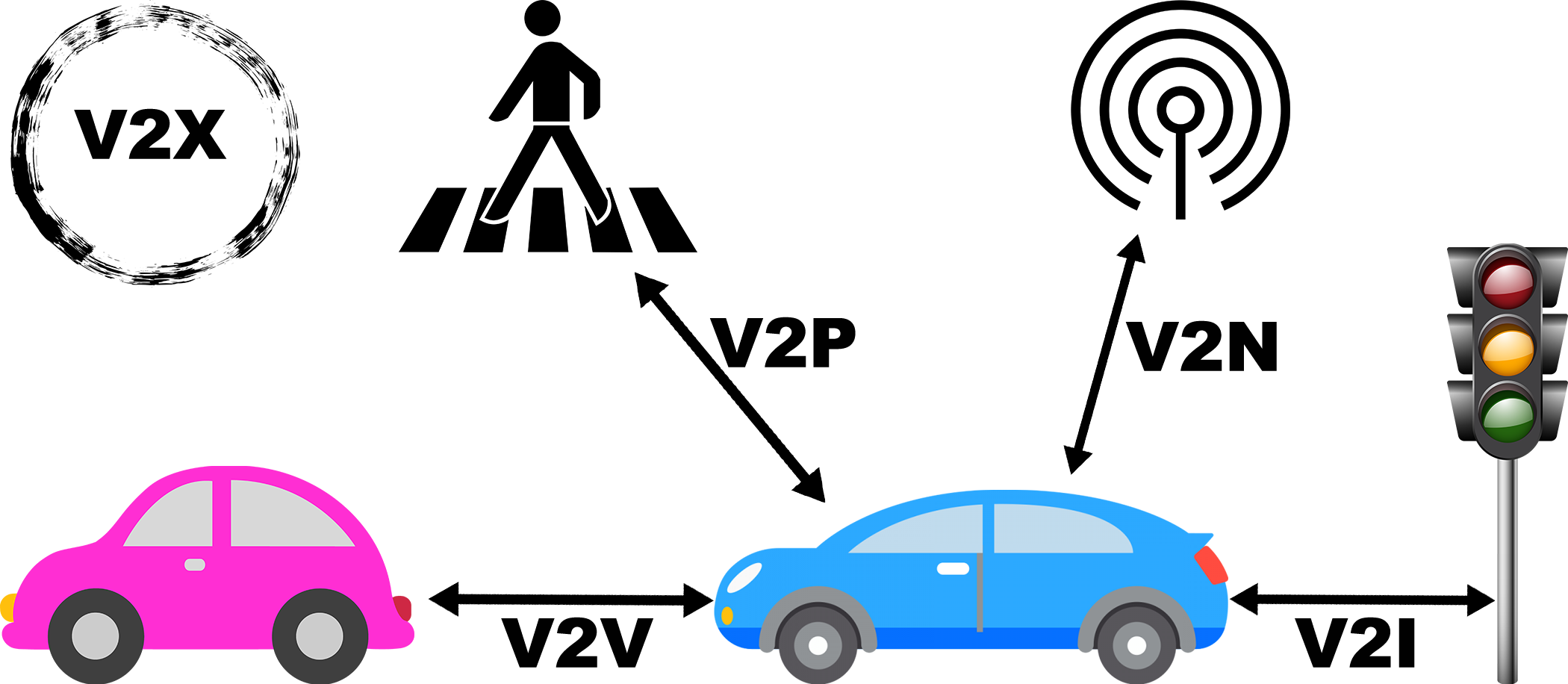
Types of V2X

Cellular V2X (C-V2X) is an umbrella term that comprises all 3rd Generation Partnership Project (3GPP) standardized vehicle-to-everything (V2X) communication technologies for connected and automated mobility. It includes both direct device-to-device communication via the sidelink interface (PC5) and network-based communication via cellular infrastructure (Uu). The direct communication mode, introduced with LTE-V2X and later extended by NR-V2X, serves as an alternative to IEEE 802.11p-based V2X technologies for short-range V2X communication.

C-V2X supports both direct communication between vehicles, vulnerable road users, and roadside units without network assistance (PC5), as well as network-based communication via cellular infrastructure (Uu). The direct communication mode typically operates in the 5.9 GHz band, which is designated for intelligent transportation systems (ITS) in many regions. Depending on deployment conditions, C-V2X can achieve communication ranges comparable to or exceeding those of DSRC.

C-V2X was developed within the 3GPP as a cellular-based approach to V2X communication. It has been promoted alongside existing V2X technologies such as IEEE 802.11p-based systems, with different regions and stakeholders pursuing different deployment strategies.

== History ==
In 2014, 3GPP initiated study items to evaluate the applicability of existing cellular technologies to vehicle-to-everything (V2X) communications. This work led to the specification of LTE-based V2X (LTE-V2X) in 3GPP Release 14, which was finalized in 2017. 3GPP Release 15 introduced the first 5G New Radio (NR) specifications, enabling network-based V2X use cases, while Release 16 added support for 5G NR sidelink (PC5) communications to address direct V2V and V2I scenarios.

In Europe, the European Union announced in July 2019 that it would adopt a technology-neutral approach to cooperative intelligent transport systems (C-ITS), allowing different communication technologies, including cellular-based and IEEE 802.11p-based solutions, to be used for V2X applications and services.

In the United States, the Federal Communications Commission proposed in late 2019 that part of the 5.9 GHz band be reallocated to support C-V2X communications. In November 2020, this proposal was adopted, allocating the upper 30 MHz (5.895–5.925 GHz) of the band primarily for C-V2X use.

After a slow initial deployment phase, influenced by regulatory uncertainty and regional policy decisions, the C-V2X ecosystem expanded steadily. By the first half of 2024, more than 50 C-V2X devices were available on the market.

== Modes ==
C-V2X supports two main communication modes, as specified by 3GPP:

- Network-based communication (Uu): communication via conventional cellular links between vehicles and the cellular network, enabling vehicle-to-network (V2N) and vehicle-to-cloud applications such as traffic management services, backend connectivity, and software updates.
- Direct communication (PC5): direct device-to-device communication between vehicles, roadside units, and vulnerable road users without requiring end-to-end network connectivity. This mode supports vehicle-to-vehicle (V2V), vehicle-to-infrastructure (V2I), and vehicle-to-pedestrian (V2P) use cases, including cooperative awareness, collision avoidance, vulnerable road user protection, and electronic toll collection.

For direct PC5 communication, different resource allocation mechanisms are defined. In LTE-V2X, distributed resource allocation is supported through sensing-based semi-persistent scheduling, allowing user equipment to autonomously select radio resources when network assistance is unavailable. Later 3GPP releases extended these mechanisms for 5G NR-V2X, introducing enhanced sidelink scheduling and improved support for advanced V2X use cases.

== Technical limitations ==
Despite the advances introduced by LTE-V2X and 5G NR-V2X, C-V2X systems remain subject to technical limitations inherent to wireless communication and cellular architectures, particularly under high-mobility and dense-traffic conditions.

Key technical limitations include:

- Limited spectrum availability in the 5.9 GHz ITS band, which constrains the number of simultaneous V2X transmissions, particularly in dense urban environments.
- Channel congestion and interference in high vehicle density scenarios, which can degrade reliability and latency for both direct (PC5) and network-based (Uu) communications.
- Propagation impairments caused by obstacles such as buildings, tunnels, and terrain, as well as high Doppler spreads resulting from vehicular mobility, which impact link robustness and packet reception rates.
- Dependence on cellular network coverage and infrastructure for Uu-based communication, leading to reduced performance or unavailability in rural areas or during network congestion.

== Outlook ==
Industry initiatives such as the 5G Automotive Association (5GAA) have published roadmaps outlining potential deployment paths for C-V2X technologies, as well as technical, regulatory and market challenges related to spectrum availability, interoperability and large-scale adoption.

To date, most deployments have focused on road safety applications and traffic efficiency use cases, with broader impacts depending on large-scale deployment and regulatory alignment.

Future C-V2X systems are expected to integrate data processing and automation techniques, including machine learning, to support advanced perception, prediction, and coordination functions. The integration of such techniques introduces additional challenges related to system validation, safety assurance, and decision transparency.

The use of automated decision-making in safety-critical systems remains an active area of research and standardization.
