= Partners for Advanced Transit and Highways =

California Partners for Advanced Transit and Highways (PATH) is a collaboration between the California Department of Transportation (Caltrans), UC Berkeley, other public and private academic institutions, and private industry. PATH's mission: applying advanced technology to increase highway capacity and safety, and to reduce traffic congestion, air pollution, and energy consumption. The organization recently celebrated its twentieth year.

Caltrans provides a portion of PATH funding; the remaining funding comes from the United States Department of Transportation, other state and local agencies, and private industry. PATH supports the research of nearly 50 faculty members and 90 graduate students. Alexander Skabardonis, adjunct professor in the Department of Civil and Environmental Engineering at UC Berkeley, is the PATH Director.

As a collaborative organization, PATH has had many partners, including public agencies, universities, and private companies. Partners include the California Department of Transportation (Caltrans); the Federal Highway Administration; the Federal Transit Administration; the National Highway Traffic Safety Administration; the Metropolitan Transportation Commission; the California Highway Patrol; the University of California, Davis, Irvine, Los Angeles, and Riverside; Claremont Graduate University; University of Southern California; George Mason University; Virginia Tech; Massachusetts Institute of Technology; Honda; Toyota; SRI International Jet Propulsion Laboratory; Honeywell; General Motors; DaimlerChrysler; and the Ford Motor Company. It is administered by the Institute of Transportation Studies at UC Berkeley, and housed at UC Berkeley's Richmond Field Station.

== Research ==
PATH's main mission is to conduct research. Primary areas of study are traffic operations, transit operations, traffic safety, and policy and behavioral research. A few examples of this work include:

- The PeMS projects collects and computes free performance data.
- VII California, a public-private partnership led by Caltrans and the Metropolitan Transit Commission, aims to develop the vehicle infrastructure by integrating it with current and innovative technologies.
- Magnetic guidance systems improve the performance of snow plows.
