= Smartcar, Inc. =

Software company

- Founded: January 2015
- Founder: Sahas Katta, Sanketh Katta
- Headquarters: Mountain View, California
- Area served: United States
- Number of employees: 50 (2022)
- Website: smartcar.com

Smartcar, Inc. is a software company based in Mountain View, California. It allows software developers to locate, unlock, and read data from vehicles using an API.

== History ==
Smartcar was founded in 2015 by Sahas and Sanketh Katta. In December 2015, the company raised $2 million in seed funding led by Andreessen Horowitz. In March 2018, the company announced a series A round of $10 million led by New Enterprise Associates (NEA) with participation from Andreessen Horowitz.

In July 2018, Smartcar emerged from stealth and launched documentation and SDKs for integrating Smartcar’s API into mobile apps and web applications.

In April 2019, Smartcar accused rival startup Otonomo of API plagiarism.

As of June 2020, venture capitalists Forest Baskett (NEA) and William Krause (Andreessen Horowitz) were serving on Smartcar’s board of directors.

In January 2022, the company announced a Series B round of $24 million, with John Tough of Energize Ventures joining the board of directors along with NEA and a16z reinvesting.

== API ==
Smartcar’s API can be integrated into mobile and web applications. The app requires the user to agree to share specific vehicle telematics information with the mobile or web application which, according to Smartcar, allows the user to locate and unlock the vehicle, check its mileage, fuel level and electric-vehicle battery remotely from the application without the need for an on-board diagnostics device. Smartcar’s customers include Samsung SmartThings, Turo, the state of Utah, and Aventi. In August 2020, Smartcar and Canadian firm Pitstop entered into a partnership to create a hardware-free maintenance tracker for fleet vehicles.
