= Internet of vehicles =

Proposed Internet-like structure connecting road vehicles

Internet of vehicles (IoV) is a network of vehicles equipped with sensors, software, and the technologies that mediate between these with the aim of connecting & exchanging data over the Internet according to agreed standards. IoV evolved from Vehicular Ad Hoc Networks ("VANET", a category of mobile ad hoc network used for communication between vehicles and roadside systems), and is expected to ultimately evolve into an "Internet of autonomous vehicles". It is expected that IoV will be one of the enablers for an autonomous, connected, electric, and shared (ACES) Future Mobility.

Road vehicles as a product category depend upon numerous technology categories from real-time analytics to commercially available sensors and embedded systems. For these to operate in symphony the IoV ecosystem is dependent upon modern infrastructure and architectures that distribute computational burden across multiple processing units in a network. In the consumer market, IoV technology is most typically referenced in discussions of smart cities and driverless cars. Many of these architectures depend for their functionality upon open-source software & systems, for instance Subaru whose vehicles' infotainment platform is able to detect a driver's wakefulness and sound an alarm to pull over for a rest.

As with other internets connecting real user/consumer experiences with networks to which those user/consumers have no access or control, concerns abound as to risks inherent in the growth of IoV, especially in the areas of privacy and security, and consequently industry and governmental moves to address these concerns have begun including the development of international standards & methods of real-time analysis. These are receiving attention from organisations including the Linux Foundation’s ELISA (Enabling Linux In Safety Applications), the connected vehicles initiative at the Institute of Electrical and Electronics Engineers (IEEE), and the Connected Car Working Group at the Cellular Telecommunications Industry Association (CTIA).

== See also ==
- Artificial intelligence of things
- Automotive security
- Cyber-physical system
- Home automation
- Indoor positioning system
- Industry 4.0
- Internet of Military Things
- Internet of things
- Open Interconnect Consortium
- OpenWSN
- Smart grid
- Web of things
