= Dedicated short-range communications =

Type of wireless communication

Dedicated short-range communications (DSRC) is a technology for direct wireless exchange of vehicle-to-everything (V2X) and other intelligent transportation systems (ITS) data between vehicles, other road users (pedestrians, cyclists, etc.), and roadside infrastructure (traffic signals, electronic message signs, etc.). DSRC, which can be used for both one- and two-way data exchanges, uses channels in the licensed 5.9 GHz band. DSRC is based on IEEE 802.11p.

== History ==
In October 1999, the United States Federal Communications Commission (FCC) allocated 75 MHz of spectrum in the 5.9 GHz band for DSRC-based ITS uses. By 2003, DSRC was used in Europe and Japan for electronic toll collection. In August 2008, the European Telecommunications Standards Institute (ETSI) allocated 30 MHz of spectrum in the 5.9 GHz band for ITS.

In November 2020, the FCC reallocated the lower 45 MHz of the 75 MHz spectrum to the neighboring 5.8 GHz ISM band for unlicensed non-ITS uses, citing DSRC's lack of adoption. Of the 30 MHz that remained for licensed ITS uses, 10 MHz was kept for DSRC (Channel 180, 5.895–5.905 GHz) and 20 MHz was reserved for a successor to DSRC, LTE-CV2X (Channel 183, 5.905–5.925 GHz).

== Applications ==
Singapore's Electronic Road Pricing scheme plans to use DSRC technology for road use measurement (ERP2) to replace its ERP1 overhead gantry method.

In June 2017, the Utah Department of Transportation and the Utah Transit Authority (UTA) demonstrated the use of DSRC for transit signal priority on SR-68 (Redwood Road) in Salt Lake City, whereby several UTA transit buses equipped with DSRC equipment could request changes to signal timing if they were running behind schedule.

Other applications include:

- Emergency warning system for vehicles
- Cooperative Adaptive Cruise Control
- Cooperative Forward Collision Warning
- Intersection collision avoidance
- Approaching emergency vehicle warning (Blue Waves)
- Vehicle safety inspection
- Emergency vehicle signal preemption
- Electronic parking payments
- Commercial vehicle clearance and safety inspections
- In-vehicle signing
- Rollover warning
- Probe data collection
- Highway-rail intersection warning
- Electronic toll collection

== Standardization ==
DSRC systems in Europe, Japan and the U.S. are incompatible and have significant differences, including spectrum and channels (5.8 GHz RF, 5.9 GHz RF, infrared), data transmission rates, and protocols.

The European standardization organisation European Committee for Standardization (CEN), sometimes in co-operation with the International Organization for Standardization (ISO) developed some DSRC standards:

- EN 12253:2004 Dedicated Short-Range Communication – Physical layer using microwave at 5.8 GHz (review)
- EN 12795:2002 Dedicated Short-Range Communication (DSRC) – DSRC Data link layer: Medium Access and Logical Link Control (review)
- EN 12834:2002 Dedicated Short-Range Communication – Application layer (review)
- EN 13372:2004 Dedicated Short-Range Communication (DSRC) – DSRC profiles for RTTT applications (review)
- EN ISO 14906:2004 Electronic Fee Collection – Application interface

Each standard addresses different layers in the OSI model communication stack.

== See also ==
- V2V
- Vehicular communication systems
- Telematics
- CALM
