= IEEE 802.11p =

Wireless communication standard for vehicles

IEEE 802.11p is an approved amendment to the IEEE 802.11 standard to add wireless access in vehicular environments (WAVE), a vehicular communication system. It defines enhancements to 802.11 (the basis of products marketed as Wi-Fi) required to support intelligent transportation systems (ITS) applications. This includes data exchange between high-speed vehicles and between the vehicles and the roadside infrastructure, so called vehicle-to-everything (V2X) communication, in the licensed ITS band of 5.9 GHz (5.85–5.925 GHz). IEEE 1609 is a higher layer standard based on the IEEE 802.11p. It is also the basis of a European standard for vehicular communication known as ETSI ITS-G5.

== Description ==
802.11p is the basis for dedicated short-range communications (DSRC), a U.S. Department of Transportation project based on the Communications Access for Land Mobiles (CALM) architecture of the International Organization for Standardization for vehicle-based communication networks, particularly for applications such as toll collection, vehicle safety services, and commerce transactions via cars. The ultimate vision was a nationwide network that enables communications between vehicles and roadside access points or other vehicles. This work built on its predecessor ASTM E2213-03 from ASTM International.

In Europe, 802.11p is used as a basis for the ITS-G5 standard, supporting the GeoNetworking protocol for vehicle to vehicle and vehicle to infrastructure communication. ITS G5 and GeoNetworking is being standardised by the European Telecommunications Standards Institute group for Intelligent Transport Systems.

=== Context ===
Because the communication link between the vehicles and the roadside infrastructure might exist for only a short time interval, the IEEE 802.11p amendment defines a method to exchange data through that link without the need to establish a basic service set (BSS), thus without the need to wait on the association and authentication procedures to complete prior to exchanging data. For that purpose, IEEE 802.11p-enabled stations use the wildcard BSSID (a value of all 1s) in the header of the frames they exchange, and may start sending and receiving data frames as soon as they arrive on the communication channel.

Because such stations are neither associated nor authenticated, the authentication and data confidentiality mechanisms provided by the IEEE 802.11 standard (and its amendments) cannot be used. These kinds of functionality must then be provided by higher network layers.

=== Timing advertisement ===
This amendment adds a new management frame for timing advertisement, which allows IEEE 802.11p enabled stations to synchronize themselves with a common time reference. The only time reference defined in the IEEE 802.11p amendment is UTC.

=== Receiver performance ===
Some optional enhanced channel rejection requirements (for both adjacent and nonadjacent channels) are specified in this amendment in order to improve the immunity of the communication system to out-of-channel interference. They only apply to OFDM transmissions in the 5 GHz band used by the IEEE 802.11a physical layer.

=== Frequency band ===
IEEE 802.11p standard typically uses channels of 10 MHz bandwidth in the 5.9 GHz band (5.850–5.925 GHz). This is half the bandwidth as used in 802.11a, or double the transmission time per data symbol. This allows the receiver to better cope with the characteristics of the radio channel in vehicular communications environments, especially echoes of signals reflected by moving objects.

== History ==
The 802.11p Task Group was formed in November 2004. Lee Armstrong was chair and Wayne Fisher technical editor. Drafts were developed from 2005 through 2009. By April 2010 draft 11 was approved by 99% affirmative votes and no comments. The approved amendment was published July 15, 2010; its title was "Amendment 6: Wireless Access in Vehicular Environments".

In August 2008, the European Commission allocated part of the 5.9 GHz band for priority transport safety applications and inter-vehicle, infrastructure communications. The intention is that compatibility with the USA will be ensured even if the allocation is not exactly the same; frequencies will be sufficiently close to enable the use of the same antenna and radio transmitter/receiver.

Simulations published in 2010 predict delays of at the most tens of milliseconds for high-priority traffic.

In November 2020, the FCC reallocated the lower 45 MHz half of the DSRC spectrum (5.850–5.895 GHz) for Wi-Fi and other unlicensed uses, arguing that the auto industry had largely failed to make use of the DSRC spectrum in its 21 years of existence, with only 15,506 vehicles in the US – 0.0057% of the total – equipped for DSRC.

== Implementations ==
In the Portuguese city of Porto, it is used as a mesh to provide vehicle data between public vehicles and wifi access for its passengers

In Europe, it is foreseen to implement a set of use cases was outlined in the European Commission document "5G Global Developments".

== See also ==
- Vehicular Reactive Routing protocol
