= Telematics =

Interdisciplinary field that encompasses telecommunications

Telematics is an interdisciplinary field encompassing telecommunications, vehicular technologies (road transport, road safety, etc.), electrical engineering (sensors, instrumentation, wireless communications, etc.), and computer science (multimedia, Internet, etc.). Telematics can involve any of the following:

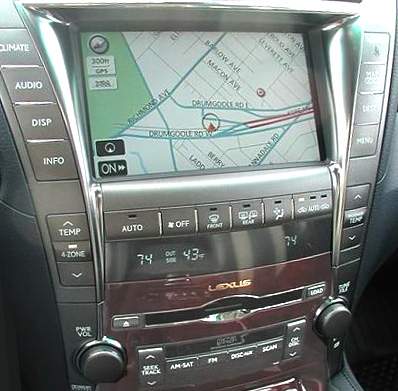
Lexus Gen V navigation system

- The technology of sending, receiving, and storing information using telecommunication devices to control remote objects
- The integrated use of telecommunications and informatics for application in vehicles and to control vehicles on the move
- Global navigation satellite system technology integrated with computers and mobile communications technology in automotive navigation systems
- (Most narrowly) The use of such systems within road vehicles (also called vehicle telematics)

== History ==
Telematics is a translation of the French word télématique, which was first coined by Simon Nora and Alain Minc in a 1978 report to the French government on the computerization of society. It referred to the transfer of information over telecommunications and was a portmanteau blending the French words télécommunications ("telecommunications") and informatique ("computing science"). The original broad meaning of telematics continues to be used in academic fields, but in commerce it now generally means vehicle telematics.

== Vehicle telematics ==
Telematics can be described as thus:

1. The convergence of telecommunications and information processing, the term later evolved to refer to automation in automobiles, such as the invention of the emergency warning system for vehicles. GPS navigation, integrated hands-free cell phones, wireless safety communications, and automatic driving assistance systems all are covered under the telematics umbrella.
2. The science of telecommunications and informatics applied in wireless technologies and computational systems. 802.11p, the IEEE standard in the 802.11 family and also referred to as Wireless Access for the Vehicular Environment (WAVE), is the primary standard that addresses and enhances Intelligent Transport System.

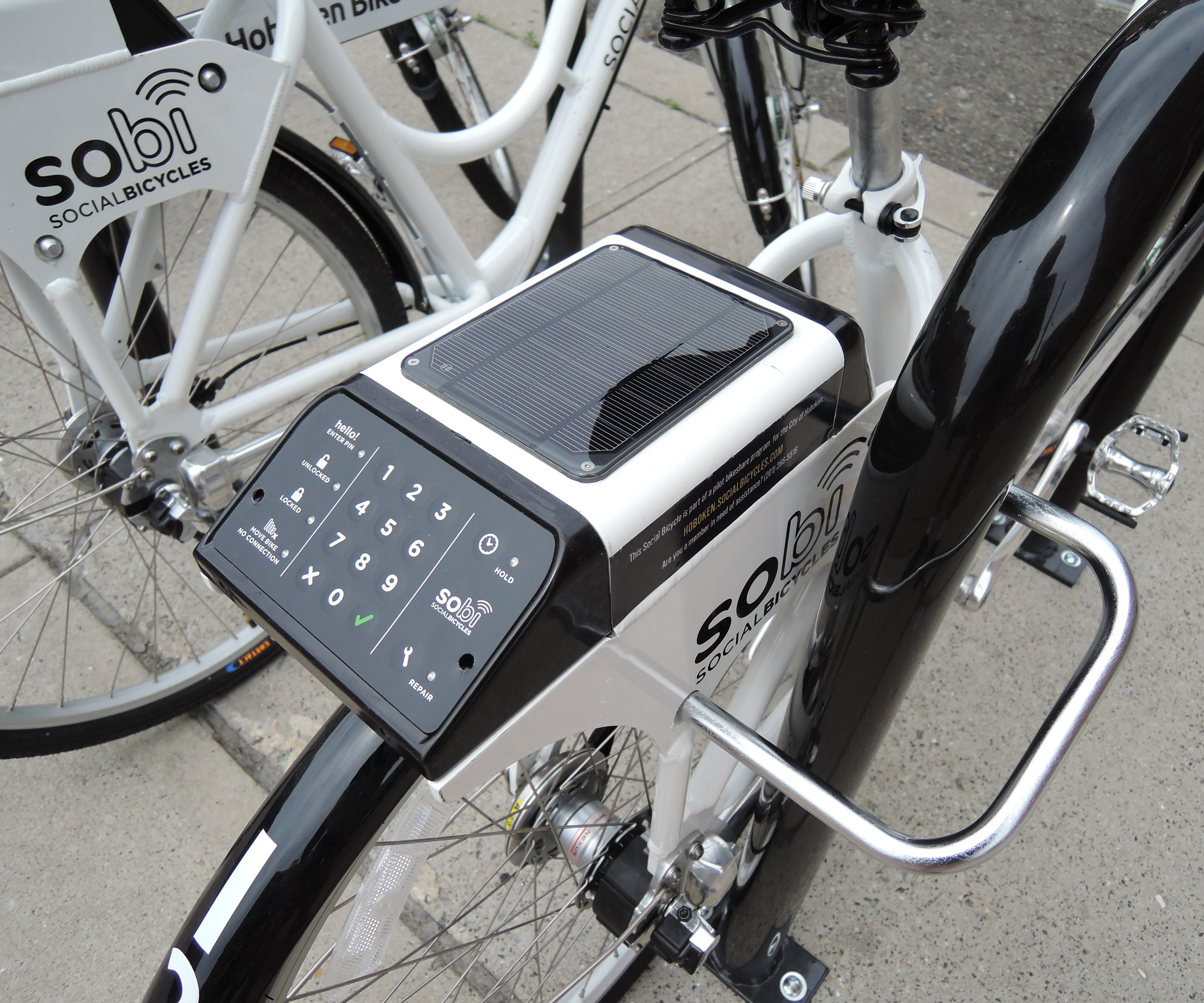
Share bicycle with solar powered electronics to track and account for its usage

Vehicle telematics can help improve the efficiency of an organization.

=== Vehicle tracking ===
Vehicle tracking is monitoring the location, movements, status, and behavior of a vehicle or fleet of vehicles. This is achieved through a combination of a GPS (GNSS) receiver and an electronic device (usually comprising a GSM GPRS modem or SMS sender) installed in each vehicle, communicating with the user (dispatching, emergency, or co-ordinating unit) and PC-based or web-based software. The data is turned into information by management reporting tools in conjunction with a visual display on computerized mapping software. Vehicle tracking systems may also use odometry or dead reckoning as an alternative or complementary means of navigation.

GPS tracking is usually accurate to around 10–20 meters, but the European Space Agency has developed the EGNOS technology to provide accuracy to 1.5 meters.

=== Trailer tracking ===
Trailer tracking refers to the tracking of movements and position of an articulated vehicle's trailer unit through the use of a location unit fitted to the trailer and a method of returning the position data via mobile communication network, IOT (Internet of things), or geostationary satellite communications for use through either PC- or web-based software.

Cold-store freight trailers that deliver fresh or frozen foods are increasingly incorporating telematics to gather time-series data on the temperature inside the cargo container, both to trigger alarms and record an audit trail for business purposes. An increasingly sophisticated array of sensors, many incorporating RFID technology, is being used to ensure the cold chain.

=== Container tracking ===
Freight containers can be tracked by GPS using a similar approach to that used for trailer tracking (i.e. a battery-powered GPS device communicating its position via mobile phone or satellite communications). Benefits of this approach include increased security and the possibility to reschedule the container transport movements based on accurate information about its location. According to Berg Insight, the installed base of tracking units in the intermodal shipping container segment reached 190,000 at the end of 2013. Growing at a compound annual growth rate of 38.2 percent, the installed base reached 960,000 units at the end of 2018.

=== Fleet management ===
Fleet management is the management of a company's fleet and includes the management of ships and/or motor vehicles such as cars, vans, and trucks. Fleet (vehicle) management can include a range of functions, such as vehicle financing, vehicle maintenance, vehicle telematics (tracking and diagnostics), driver management, fuel management, health and safety management, and dynamic vehicle scheduling. Fleet management is a function which allows companies that rely on transport in their business to remove or minimize the risks associated with vehicle investment, improving efficiency and productivity while reducing overall transport costs and ensuring compliance with government legislation and Duty of Care obligations. These functions can either be dealt with by an in-house fleet management department or an outsourced fleet management provider.

=== Telematics standards ===
The Association of Equipment Management Professionals (AEMP) developed the industry's first telematics standard.

In 2008, AEMP brought together the major construction equipment manufacturers and telematics providers in the heavy equipment industry to discuss the development of the industry's first telematics standard. Following agreement from Caterpillar, Volvo CE, Komatsu, and John Deere Construction & Forestry to support such a standard, the AEMP formed a standards development subcommittee chaired by Pat Crail CEM to develop the standard. This committee consisted of developers provided by the Caterpillar/Trimble joint venture known as Virtual Site Solutions, Volvo CE, and John Deere. This group worked from February 2009 through September 2010 to develop the industry's first standard for the delivery of telematics data.

The result, the AEMP Telematics Data Standard V1.1, was released in 2010 and officially went live on October 1, 2010. As of November 1, 2010, Caterpillar, Volvo CE, John Deere Construction & Forestry, OEM Data Delivery, and Navman Wireless are able to support customers with delivery of basic telematics data in a standard xml format. Komatsu, Topcon, and others are finishing beta testing and have indicated their ability to support customers in the near future.

The AEMP's telematics data standard was developed to allow end users to integrate key telematics data (operating hours, location, fuel consumed, and odometer reading where applicable) into their existing fleet management reporting systems. As such, the standard was primarily intended to facilitate importation of these data elements into enterprise software systems such as those used by many medium-to-large construction contractors. Prior to the standard, end users had few options for integrating this data into their reporting systems in a mixed-fleet environment consisting of multiple brands of machines and a mix of telematics-equipped machines and legacy machines (those without telematics devices where operating data is still reported manually via pen and paper). One option available to machine owners was to visit multiple websites to manually retrieve data from each manufacturer's telematics interface and then manually enter it into their fleet management program's database. This option was cumbersome and labor-intensive.

A second option was for the end user to develop an API (Application Programming Interface), or program, to integrate the data from each telematics provider into their database. This option was quite costly as each telematics provider had different procedures for accessing and retrieving the data and the data format varied from provider to provider. This option automated the process, but because each provider required a unique, custom API to retrieve and parse the data, it was an expensive option. In addition, another API had to be developed any time another brand of machine or telematics device was added to the fleet.

A third option for mixed-fleet integration was to replace the various factory-installed telematics devices with devices from a third party telematics provider. Although this solved the problem of having multiple data providers requiring unique integration methods, this was by far the most expensive option. In addition to the expense, many third-party devices available for construction equipment are unable to access data directly from the machine's electronic control modules (ECMs), or computers, and are more limited than the device installed by the OEM (Cat, Volvo, Deere, Komatsu, etc.) in the data they are able to provide. In some cases, these devices are limited to location and engine runtime, although they are increasingly able to accommodate a number of add-on sensors to provide additional data.

The AEMP Telematics Data Standard provides a fourth option. By concentrating on the key data elements that drive the majority of fleet management reports (hours, miles, location, fuel consumption), making those data elements available in a standardized xml format, and standardizing the means by which the document is retrieved, the standard enables the end user to use one API to retrieve data from any participating telematics provider (as opposed to the unique API for each provider that was required previously), greatly reducing integration development costs.

The current draft version of the AEMP Telematics Data Standard is now called the AEM/AEMP Draft Telematics API Standard, which expands the original standard Version 1.2 to include 19 data fields (with fault code capability). This new draft standard is a collaborative effort of AEMP and the Association of Equipment Manufacturers (AEM), working on behalf of their members and the industry. This Draft API replaces the current version 1.2 and does not currently cover some types of equipment, e.g., agriculture equipment, cranes, mobile elevating work platforms, air compressors, and other niche products.

In addition to the new data fields, the AEM/AEMP Draft Telematics API Standard changes how data is accessed in an effort to make it easier to consume and integrate with other systems and processes. It includes standardized communication protocols for the ability to transfer telematics information in mixed-equipment fleets to end user business enterprise systems, enabling the end user to employ their own business software to collect and then analyze asset data from mixed-equipment fleets without the need to work across multiple telematics provider applications.

To achieve a globally recognized standard for conformity worldwide, the AEM/AEMP Draft Telematics API Standard will be submitted for acceptance by the International Organization for Standardization (ISO). Final language is dependent upon completion of the ISO acceptance process.

=== Satellite navigation ===
Satellite navigation in the context of vehicle telematics is the technology of using a GPS and electronic mapping tool to enable a driver to locate a position, plan a route, and navigate a journey.

=== Mobile data ===
Mobile data is the use of wireless data communications using radio waves to send and receive real-time computer data to, from, and between devices used by field-based personnel. These devices can be fitted solely for use while in the vehicle (Fixed Data Terminal) or for use in and out of the vehicle (Mobile Data Terminal). See mobile Internet.

The common methods for mobile data communication for telematics were based on private vendors' RF communication infrastructure. During the early 2000s, manufacturers of mobile data terminals/AVL devices moved to try cellular data communication to offer cheaper ways to transmit telematics information and wider range based on cellular provider coverage. Since then, as a result of cellular providers offering low GPRS (2.5G) and later UMTS (3G) rates, mobile data is almost totally offered to telematics customers via cellular communication.

=== Wireless vehicle safety communications ===
Wireless vehicle safety communications telematics aid in car safety and road safety. It is an electronic subsystem in a vehicle used for exchanging safety information about road hazards and the locations and speeds of vehicles over short-range radio links. This may involve temporary ad hoc wireless local area networks.

Wireless units are often installed in vehicles and fixed locations, such as near traffic signals and emergency call boxes along the road. Sensors in vehicles and at fixed locations, as well as in possible connections to wider networks, provide information displayed to drivers. The range of the radio links can be extended by forwarding messages along multi-hop paths. Even without fixed units, information about fixed hazards can be maintained by moving vehicles by passing it backwards. It also seems possible for traffic lights, which one can expect to become smarter, to use this information to reduce the chance of collisions.

In the future, it may connect directly to the adaptive cruise control or other vehicle control aids. Cars and trucks with the wireless system connected to their brakes may move in convoys to save fuel and space on the roads. When a column member slows down, those behind it will automatically slow also. Certain scenarios may required less engineering effort, such as when a radio beacon is connected to a brake light.

In fall 2008, network ideas were tested in Europe, where radio frequency bandwidth had been allocated. The 30 MHz allocated is at 5.9 GHz, and unallocated bandwidth at 5.4 GHz may also be used. The standard is IEEE 802.11p, a low-latency form of the Wi-Fi local area network standard. Similar efforts are underway in Japan and the USA.

=== Emergency warning system for vehicles ===
Telematics technologies are self-orientating open network architecture structures of variable programmable intelligent beacons developed for application in the development of intelligent vehicles with the intent to accord (blend or mesh) warning information with surrounding vehicles in the vicinity of travel, intra-vehicle, and infrastructure. Emergency warning systems for vehicle telematics are developed particularly for international harmonization and standardization of vehicle-to-vehicle, infrastructure-to-vehicle, and vehicle-to-infrastructure real-time Dedicated Short-Range Communication (DSRC) systems.

Telematics most commonly relate to computerized systems that update information at the same rate they receive data, enabling them to direct or control a process such as an instantaneous autonomous warning notification in a remote machine or group of machines. In the use of telematics relating to intelligent vehicle technologies, instantaneous direction travel cognizance of a vehicle may be transmitted in real-time to surrounding vehicles traveling in the local area of vehicles equipped (with EWSV) to receive said warning signals of danger.

=== Intelligent vehicle technologies ===
Telematics comprise electronic, electromechanical, and electromagnetic devices—usually silicon micro-machined components operating in conjunction with computer-controlled devices and radio transceivers to provide precision repeatability functions (such as in robotics artificial intelligence systems) emergency warning validation performance reconstruction.

Intelligent vehicle technologies commonly apply to car safety systems and self-contained autonomous electromechanical sensors generating warnings that can be transmitted within a specified targeted area of interest, i.e. within 100 meters of the emergency warning system for the vehicle's transceiver. In ground applications, intelligent vehicle technologies are utilized for safety and commercial communications between vehicles or between a vehicle and a sensor along the road.

On November 3, 2009, the most advanced Intelligent Vehicle concept car was demonstrated in New York City when a 2010 Toyota Prius became the first LTE connected car. The demonstration was provided by the NG Connect project, a collaboration of automotive telematic technologies designed to exploit in-car 4G wireless network connectivity.

=== Carsharing ===
Telematics technology has enabled the emergence of carsharing services such as Local Motion, Uber, Lyft, Car2Go, Zipcar worldwide, or City Car Club in the UK. Telematics-enabled computers allow organizers to track members' usage and bill them on a pay-as-you-drive basis. Some systems show users where to find an idle vehicle. Car Clubs such as Australia's Charter Drive use telematics to monitor and report on vehicle use within predefined geofence areas to demonstrate the reach of their transit media car club fleet.

=== Auto insurance/Usage-based insurance (UBI) ===
The general idea of telematics auto insurance is that a driver's behavior is monitored directly while the person drives and this information is transmitted to an insurance company. The insurance company then assesses the risk of that driver having an accident and charges insurance premiums accordingly. A driver who drives less responsibly will be charged a higher premium than a driver who drives smoothly and with less calculated risk of claim propensity. Other benefits can be delivered to end users with Telematics2.0-based telematics as customer engagement can be enhanced with direct customer interaction.

Telematics auto insurance was independently invented and patented by a major U.S. auto insurance company, Progressive Auto Insurance U.S. patent 5,797,134, and a Spanish independent inventor, Salvador Minguijon Perez (European Patent EP0700009B1). The Perez patents cover monitoring the car's engine control computer to determine distance driven, speed, time of day, braking force, etc. Progressive is currently developing the Perez technology in the U.S. and European auto insurer Norwich Union is developing the Progressive technology for Europe. Both patents have since been overturned in courts due to prior work in the commercial insurance sectors.

Trials conducted by Norwich Union in 2005 found that young drivers (18- to 23-year-olds) signing up for telematics auto insurance have had a 20% lower accident rate than average.

In 2007, theoretical economic research on the social welfare effects of Progressive's telematics technology business process patents questioned whether the business process patents are pareto efficient for society. Preliminary results suggested that it was not, but more work is needed. In April 2014, Progressive patents were overturned by the U.S. legal system on the grounds of "lack of originality."

The smartphone as the in-vehicle device for insurance telematics has been discussed in great detail and the instruments are available for the design of smartphone-driven insurance telematics.

== Telematics education ==
=== Engineering Degree programs ===
- Universidad Icesi in Colombia created the first Telematics Engineering program in the country in 1998. The program requires 10 semesters of full-time studies, after which students receive the professional title of Ingeniero(a) Telemático(a).
- Federico Santa María Technical University (UTFSM) in Chile has a Telematics Engineering program which is a six-year full-time program of study (12 academic semesters). The final degree in Telematics Engineering has the title of Ingeniería Civil Telemática (with the suffix of Civil).
- Pontifical Catholic University Mother and Teacher (PUCMM) in the Dominican Republic has a Telematics Engineering program which is a four-year full-time program of study (12 academic four-month periods). The final degree in Telematics Engineering has the title of Ingeniería Telemática.

=== University Bachelor programs ===
- Harokopio University of Athens has a four-year full-time program of study. The department goal is the development and advancement of computer science, primarily in the field of network information systems and relative e-services. For this purpose, attention is focused in the fields of telematics (teleinformatics) which are relative to network and internet technologies, e-business, e-government, e-health, advanced transport telematics, etc.
- TH Wildau in Wildau, Germany has provided a three-year full-time telematics Bachelor study program since 1999.
- TU Graz in Graz, Austria offers a three-year Bachelor in telematics (now called "Information and Computer Engineering").
- Singapore Institute of Technology offers a three-year Bachelor in Telematics.
- National Open and Distance Learning University of Mexico* (UNADM) offers a four-year degree in Telematics delivered online.

=== University Masters programs ===
Several universities provide two-year Telematics Master of Science programs:

- Norwegian University of Science and Technology (NTNU), Norway
- University of Twente (UT), The Netherlands
- University Carlos III of Madrid (UC3M), Spain
- Harokopio University Athens
- TH Wildau in Wildau, Germany
- TU Graz in Graz, Austria (now called "Information and Computer Engineering")

=== European Automotive Digital Innovation Studio (EADIS) ===
In 2007, a project entitled the European Automotive Digital Innovation Studio (EADIS) was awarded 400,000 Euros from the European Commission under its Leonardo da Vinci program. EADIS used a virtual work environment called the Digital Innovation Studio to train and develop professional designers in the automotive industry in the impact and application of vehicle telematics so they could integrate new technologies into future products within the automotive industry. Funding ended in 2013.

== See also ==
- Artificial Passenger
- Fleet telematics system
- Floating car data
- GNSS road pricing
- Infotainment
- Map database management
- Mass surveillance
- Telematic art
- Telematic control unit
- Telematics for Libraries Program
