= Shaoshan Liu =

Computer scientist

- Born: Guangzhou, China
- Education: University of California, Irvine; Harvard University
- Title: a member of ACM a senior member of IEEE

Shaoshan Liu is a US-based computer scientist, entrepreneur, and researcher in robotics and autonomous driving. He is the founder, chairman, and CEO of PerceptIn, a company focused on visual intelligence for autonomous systems.

Liu holds a Ph.D. in computer engineering from the University of California, Irvine and a M.P.A. from Harvard University. His research focuses on computer architecture, deep learning infrastructure, and robotics. He is a senior member of the IEEE, a member of the ACM, and serves as the vice chair of the IEEE Computer Society's Special Technical Community on Autonomous Driving Technologies.

== Early life and education ==
Shaoshan Liu was born in Guangzhou, China. Liu took undergraduate and graduate courses at the UCI, where he obtained a Ph.D. in 2010. He earned a M.P.A. from Harvard University.

== Career ==
Prior to his entrepreneur venture, he worked at LinkedIn, Broadcom and Microsoft. In 2016, Liu established PerceptIn, a California-based visual intelligence technology company.

== Selected published books ==
- Value Prediction in Many-core Systems. University of California, Irvine. 2010. ISBN 978-1-109-64876-8.
- The Handbook of Driverless Technology. Publishing House of Electronics Industry. 2019. ISBN 978-7-121-31355-4. OCLC 1050522595.
- Driverless: How Artificial Intelligence Subverts the Auto Industry. Machinery Industry Publishing House. 2019. ISBN 978-7-111-61117-2. OCLC 1112267786.
- Engineering Autonomous Vehicles and Robots: The DragonFly Modular-based Approach. Wiley. 2020. ISBN 978-1-119-57056-1.
- Creating Autonomous Vehicle Systems. Morgan & Claypool Publishers. 2020. ISBN 978-1-68173-935-9.
- Robotic Computing on FPGAs. Morgan & Claypool Publishers. 2021. ISBN 978-1-63639-165-6.
