= ParkShuttle =

Autonomous vehicle service in Rotterdam, the Netherlands

Parkshuttle
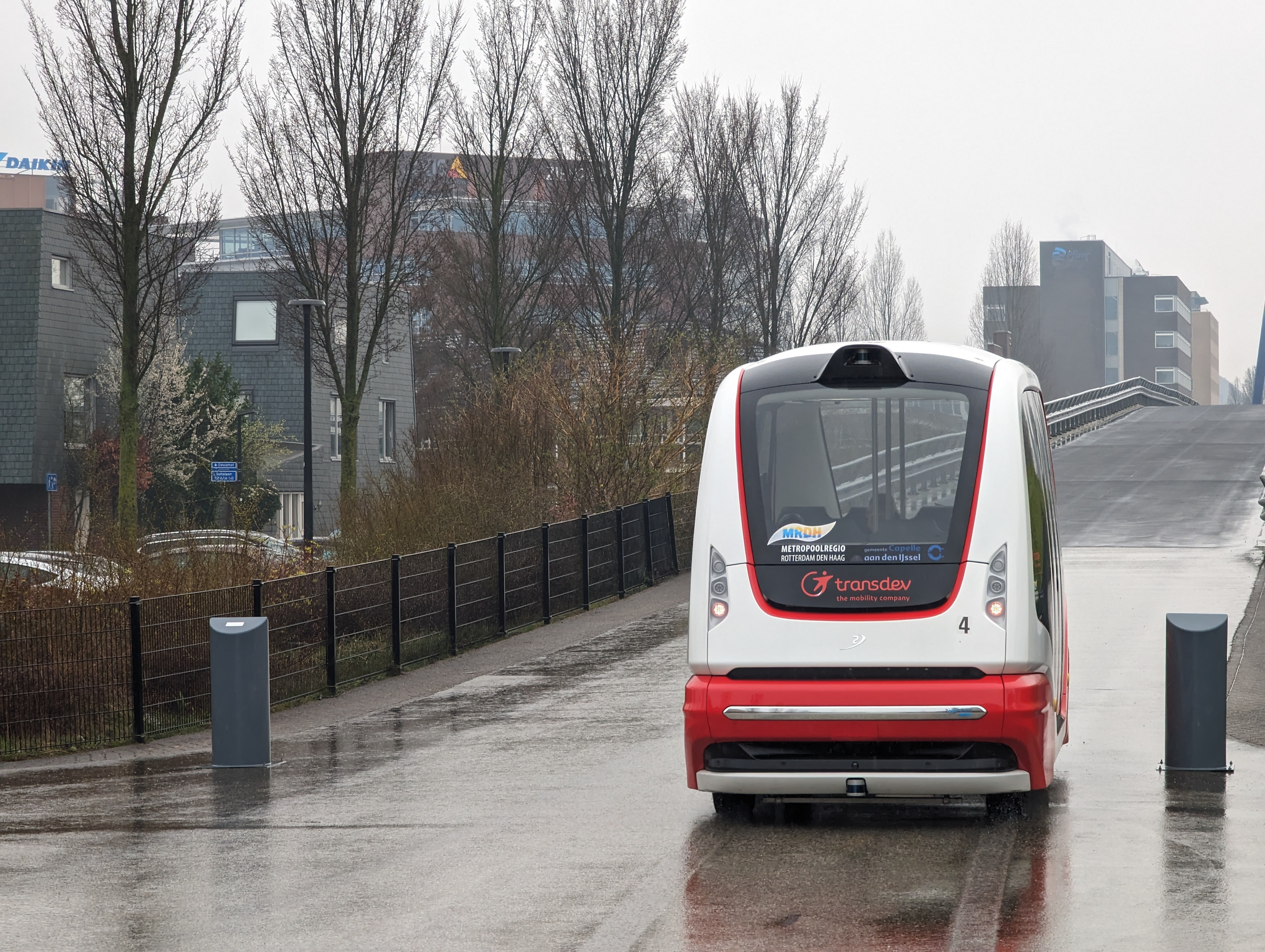
- Parkshuttle vehicle driving onto a bridge in 2024

Overview
- Owner: Rotterdam-The Hague metropolitan area
- Locale: Rotterdam
- Termini: Kralingse Zoom metro station; Rivium Business Park
- Stations: 5

Service
- Type: People Mover, self-driving bus
- Services: 1
- Operator: Connexxion
- Rolling stock: 6
- Daily ridership: 1,200 (2018)

History
- Opened: 1999

Technical
- Line length: 1.8 kilometres (1.1 mi)
- Num of tracks: 2 lanes (except bridge over N210 and underpass below A16, single lane)
- Operating speed: 32 kilometres per hour (20 mph)

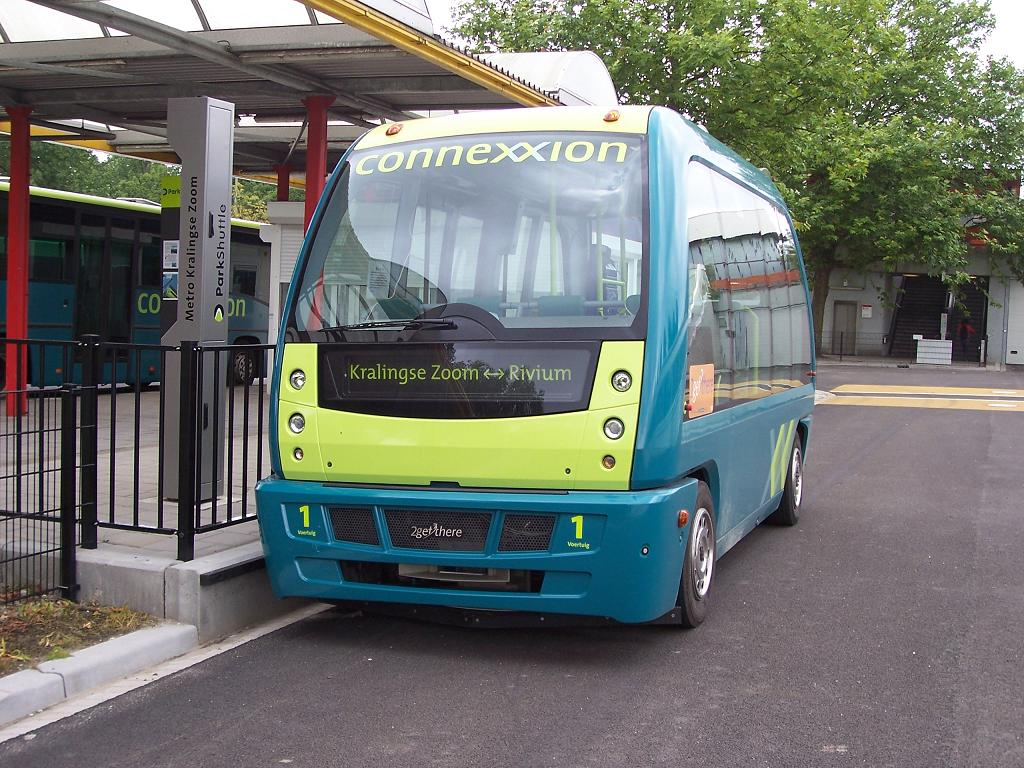
Parkshuttle II vehicle outside Kralingse Zoom station during testing in 2005

The ParkShuttle is an electrically-driven, autonomous shuttle service that runs between Kralingse Zoom metro station in Rotterdam to the Rivium business park in Capelle aan den IJssel. The system first opened 1999 and has been extended since. It has three stops in Rivium (at the 4th, 2nd and 1st streets), a stop Fascinatio (serving the residential area in Capelle aan den IJssel and the Brainpark III business park) and finally at Kralingse Zoom metro station. In 2022 six vehicles of the third generation entered service.

Parkshuttle is owned by the Rotterdam-The Hague metropolitan area (MRDH) and operated by the Connexxion bus company. The route lies on its own right-of-way, but it does have level crossings with cars, cyclists and pedestrians. It is double-lane throughout except for a bridge over the N210 "Abraham van Rijckevorselweg" highway and an underpass below the A16 motorway to connect to the railway station.

On weekdays, the Shuttle runs between 06:00 and 21:00. During rush hour a shuttle runs every 2.5 minutes. Outside rush hours, the shuttle runs on demand with passengers pressing a button at the station to summon a vehicle.

In 2018 it was unique as the only operational automated road vehicle in Europe in permanent (revenue generating) service. Since 2015 a number of similar shared autonomous vehicle systems have been developed and trialed in routes shared with other vehicles or pedestrians. The ParkShuttle was trialed in 2019 at both Brussels Airport and at Nanyang Technological University in Singapore. Some other systems are in operation on private roads (such as around factories). As of 2021 some revenue systems are being trialed.

== Features ==
The system, a hybrid between a personal rapid transit and an automated people mover, works like a horizontal elevator. A shuttle can be manually called at the stop, and there are buttons in the shuttle to request each stop individually (compared to a regular bus service, where stops must be requested at the appropriate time and location).

As of 2018, the route is 1.8 kilometres (1.1 mi) long and uses six shuttle vehicles numbered 1 through 6 (administratively numbered 5801 to 5806).

The vehicles are fully automatic and follow a virtual route where their positions are checked based on artificial reference points (in the form of small magnets in the road surface). They stop at fixed positions at the stations, most of which can fit two shuttles, one behind another. They were originally uni-directional (with front-wheel steering) and reversed direction at turning loops at both ends of the route, though they can also go in reverse as of Generation III. There is an automatic charging station at the Kralingse Zoom metro station where the batteries of the shuttles are charged every day.

The shuttles are designated as line 500 in timetables, but this is not indicated on the shuttles. The service was free of charge to use until the end of 2011, due to the lack of ticket machines and validators (later replaced by OV-chipcard readers) along with supervisors. Since the end of 2011, OV-chipcard readers are installed at the stops and no paper tickets are sold. As OV-chipcards can only be bought at the metro station proper (not the shuttle stop), passengers must have an OV chipcard on hand when boarding at other stops.

== Experimental phase ==
An experimental phase started in 1997 with a vehicle that drove without any passengers for the first three months. The next three months test passengers rode the vehicle and crossing traffic was simulated. During the experimental phase a steward was in the vehicle. Eventually regular passengers were able to use the vehicle and the steward was no longer needed in the vehicle.

== Generation I ==
The first version of the Parkshuttle ran from February 1999 to 2001 between Rotterdam and Capelle aan den IJssel. An evaluation showed that the new vehicle needed to be able to move more passengers and the waiting time had to be reduced. Furthermore, there was a need for a reliable system and better travel information.

== Generation II ==
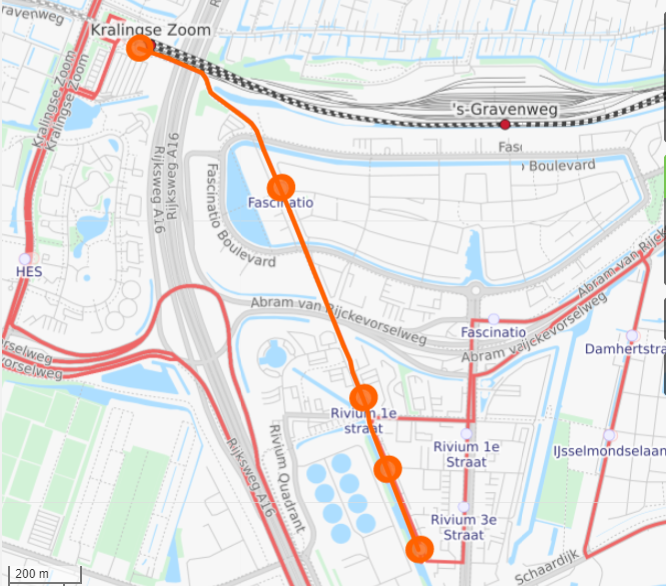
Map of ParkShuttle route in Rivium

For ParkShuttle II the route was extended and became dual lane. New vehicles were introduced with more transport capacity: ParkShuttle II can carry a maximum of 22 passengers. The system and the vehicles were supplied by 2getthere, where Spijkstaal supplied the chassis and drive system and the design was made by Duvedec.

On 1 December 2006 ParkShuttle II was officially inaugurated by Prime Minister Jan Peter Balkenende. A day later the ParkShuttle was open to the public. Prior to that, concessionaire Connexxion had been granted a concession for the period 2006-2011. In 2011, after a new tender, the concession for a further period of 5 years was awarded to Connexxion. In 2016 the concession was extended by 2 years until December 2018.

Shortly after the system was put into operation, a collision occurred between two vehicles (without a driver) during start-up. The analysis of the incident showed that, after loss of communication at start-up of the system and after removal of the vehicle, an error was made by the supervisor as a result of which two other vehicles were allowed to enter the single lane section from different sides. The obstacle detection system did react, but could not prevent the collision. In addition, one vehicle was damaged by a fire in the storage of the vehicles.

After repairing the vehicles, the ParkShuttle has been running without any significant problems ever since.

During the period of April 2011 to December 2011, the system was out of service due to the construction of a parking garage at the Kralingse Zoom station. The ParkShuttle could not be used because the lane was blocked. A replacement bus service was used during this period. This bus service also runs in case of emergencies and drives on a lane next to the ParkShuttle.

The Metropolitan region Rotterdam-The Hague and the municipality of Capelle aan den IJssel undertook major maintenance on the existing ParkShuttle lane at the beginning of 2017.

== Generation III ==
On 7 March 2018 the MRDH granted Connexxion a new concession for 15 years, for the period December 2018 to December 2033. This concession includes an extension of the route, renewal of the fleet of shuttles and driving in mixed traffic on some parts of the route. The supplier of the system is again 2getthere, who has worked together with the municipality of Capelle aan den IJssel for this purpose. Together they have submitted a proposal for the replacement and extension with the Marketplace for Infrastructure of the 'Verkeersonderneming', which was granted early 2017. With this, the 'Verkeersonderneming' is responsible for 50% of the costs of realization.

In 2019 the vehicles were due to be replaced and the route extended to the Nieuwe Maas waterway, where passengers can change to the Waterbus at the Van Brienenoordbrug stop. In November 2022, after some delays due to the COVID-19 pandemic, the new third generation shuttles went into operation. The new vehicles are lighter than before, have air-conditioning and can drive in two directions which means the turning loops at the termini are no longer needed.

It is foreseen to extend the existing route towards the waterfront where a stop for the Waterbus will be created. On the extended route, the ParkShuttle will autonomously drive on the public road in mixed traffic.

== See also ==
- Personal Rapid Transit
- Vehicular automation#Shared autonomous vehicles
