= Imagry =

Autonomous driving software company

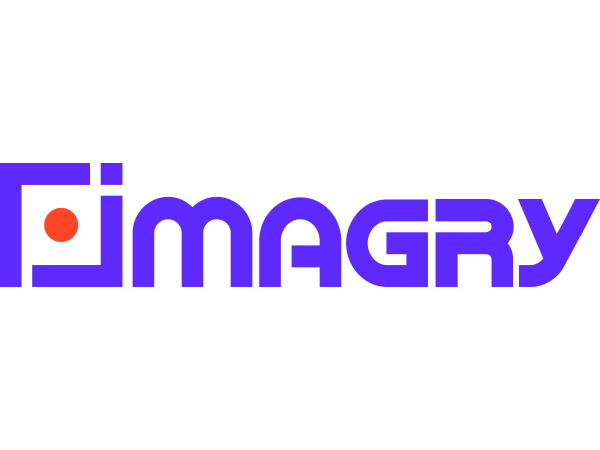
- Industry: Autonomous driving
- Founded: 2015
- Founders: Adham Ghazali and Majed Jubeh
- Headquarters: San Jose, California
- Key people: Eran Ofir (CEO), Ilan Shaviv (CTO)
- Website: imagry.co

Imagry is an autonomous driving (AD) technology company that develops HD-mapless artificial intelligence (AI)-based autonomous mobility systems for public transportation. The company develops real-time vision-based autonomous driving software for buses, vans, and passenger vehicles, designed to operate without high-definition maps or specialized road infrastructure. As of 2026, Imagry has deployed autonomous driving systems for public transportation in Japan, Germany, the United States, and Israel.

== History ==
Imagry was founded in 2015 by Adham Ghazali and Majed Jubeh and has been specializing in the automotive sector since 2018. At the beginning of 2019, Imagry released its first version of its mapless autonomous driving software. The company's first funding was obtained in May 2016. To date the company has raised funding of $69.5M in total.

In 2023, Imagry won a tender to provide the first autonomous bus in Israel, deployed at the largest medical center in the Middle East (Sheba Tel HaShomer City of Health), followed by a second tender win for the first autonomous bus on a public road in Israel. In 2024, the company began operating the first autonomous bus line in Israel in Nahariya.

In 2023, the company received the Software Sensor Award from ICA (Innovation Connectivity Autonomous). In 2023, Imagry received Frost & Sullivan's the 2023 Enabling Technology Leadership Award - identified as best in class in the European autonomous driving solutions industry, and in 2025, it received Frost & Sullivan's Global Customer Value Leadership Award.

In 2024, Imagry shifted its focus from supplying autonomous driving software to automotive original equipment manufacturers (OEMs) and Tier 1 suppliers for passenger vehicles to developing autonomous driving systems for public transportation.

== Operations ==
Imagry specializes in providing mapless driving technologies tailored to enable Level 3-4 autonomous vehicles. The company's platform is designed to operate independently of hardware specifications, utilizing high-resolution visible spectrum (VIS) cameras. Imagry's software operates in real-time and relies on a vision-based perception network, eliminating the need for high-definition (HD) maps. Imagry provides HD-mapless, AI-based autonomous mobility software for public transportation in city centers, rural areas, and operational zones, partnering with bus manufacturers, corporate shuttle agencies, and car-sharing fleets to integrate its software into M1, M2, and M3-category vehicles.

Imagry operates with headquarters in San Jose, California and an additional development center in Haifa, Israel. As of November 2024, the company employed approximately 120 people across both locations. Since 2019, it has been operating a fleet of vehicles equipped with its autonomous driving software on public roads in the U.S., Germany, Japan, and Israel. Imagry has also been selected as an autonomous transport system vendor by the transportation operator Transdev.

As of 2026, Imagry is led by chief executive officer Eran Ofir, and chief technology officer Ilan Shaviv.

== Technology ==
Imagry collects and processes peripheral information from several cameras installed on the vehicle. This data is sent to a computer in the vehicle whose purpose is to perform, in real-time, the actions that will allow the vehicle to drive autonomously. This technology relies on cost-effective sensors, negating the necessity for a persistent satellite connection or extensive investments in digital HD mapping of roads and cities.

The Imagry solution uses strong machine learning, AI, spatial DCNN (Deep Convolutional Neural Networks), and learning-based IP to plan the motion of the vehicle. Its platform called Imagry Cortex uses visible-spectrum cameras placed around the vehicle to generate a real-time, 360-degree model of the surrounding area to a range of 300 metres (980 ft). Its buses meet UN Regulation No. 155 cybersecurity requirements and have achieved a perfect score in Euro NCAP safety-scenario testing.

== Partnerships ==
The company also partnered with Continental to integrate part of Imagry's technology in the Continental Autonomous Parking solution.

In November 2025, Imagry and Carguru entered into a strategic partnership, integrating Imagry's AI-based autonomous driving technology into passenger vehicles to create roboshuttles in San Jose, USA and Riga, Latvia. The final implementation stage of this partnership is scheduled for 2027 and will support bookable paid rides on the Carguru roboshuttle through a dedicated app. The initial route runs approximately 9.8 kilometres (6.1 mi) between Riga Airport and the Freedom Monument.

In December 2025, Imagry and Toyota Tsusho announced a collaboration to pilot autonomous public buses on public roads in Japan. Imagry has also announced a partnership with electric-bus manufacturer eVersum to integrate its autonomous driving technology into M3-category electric buses, with an initial deployment in Japan in 2026.

In August 2026, Imagry partnered with Spanish bus manufacturer UNVI to integrate its HD-mapless autonomous driving system into UNVI's electric buses, with the first vehicle scheduled for deployment in Germany in 2026.
