= Spijkstaal =

Dutch car manufacturer

- Industry: Automotive
- Founded: 1938
- Founder: Gerrit Neuteboom
- Headquarters: Spijkenisse, Netherlands
- Products: Electric vehicles
- Owner: Peineeman Holding

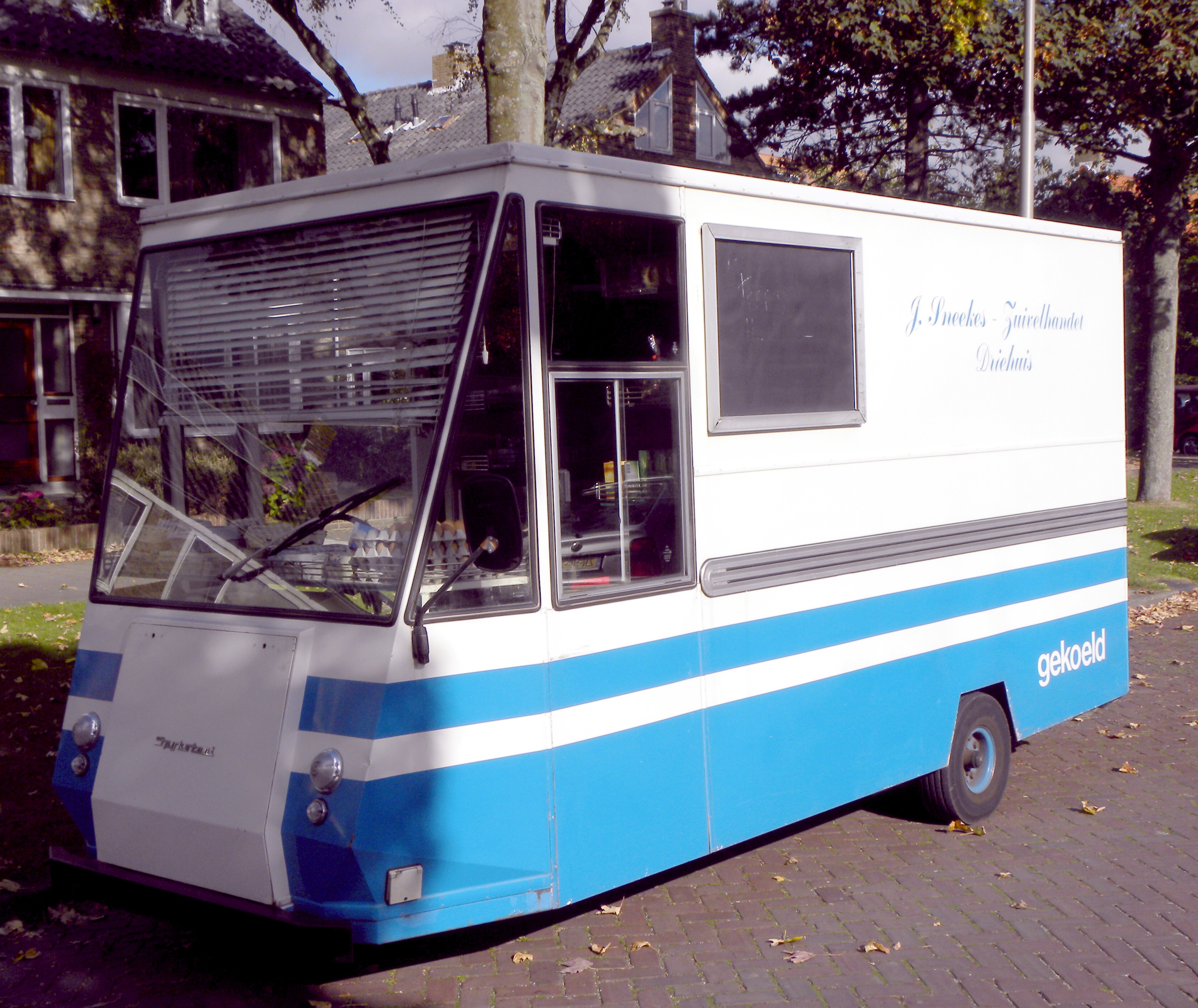
A Spijkstaal van from 1984

Spijkstaal is a Dutch car company from Spijkenisse, Netherlands. It specializes in electric cars, especially trucks for industrial usage. Its electric carts operate in Amsterdam Airport Schiphol, flower auctions including the Royal FloraHolland, and military airfields. Among the general public, Spijkstaal is mostly known for being the manufacturer of mobile grocery stores.

== History ==
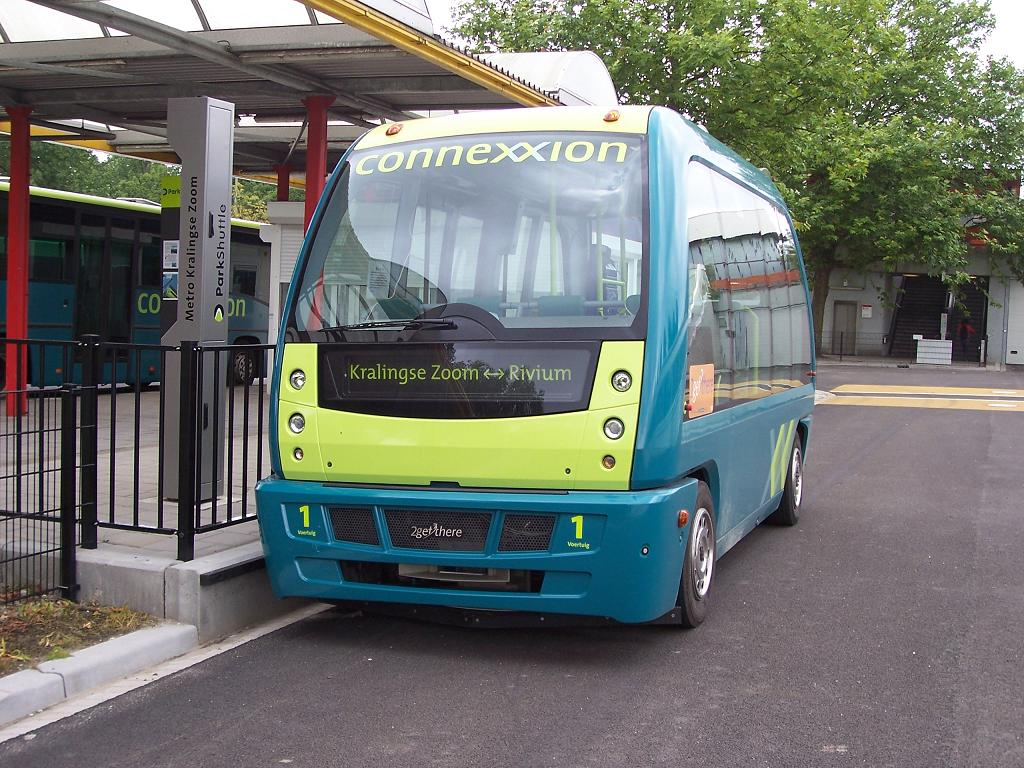
A ParkShuttle bus in 2005. The chassis was made by Spijkstaal.

In 1934 Gerrit Neuteboom, a smith from Spijkenisse, won first prize in an agricultural exhibition in Kruiningen in Zeeland with a steel-framed farm wagon with pneumatic tires, which could therefore bear heavier loads and took less horse power to pull. In 1938 he founded the company Spijkstaal, producing wagons for the agricultural sector. In the fifties the company diversified to produce trailers, windows and other construction elements, as well as movable bandstands in association with former-wainwright-turned-coachbuilder Henk Koornneef.

In 1995, Spijkstaal converted a conventional Volkswagen Caravelle into a fully-electric van that could hold eight passengers, part of a project testing the viability of fully electric consumer vehicles in the Netherlands. Spijkstaal provided the chassis for the ParkShuttle autonomous shuttle service in Capelle aan den IJssel and Rotterdam. Spijkstaal Elektro declared bankruptcy in 2015 and was acquired in September 2015 by Peinemann Holding, continuing operations as Spijkstaal International.

== See also ==
- List of Western European automobile manufacturers
