= EasyMile EZ10 =

Battery-powered autonomous electric bus

EZ10 Easy Mile
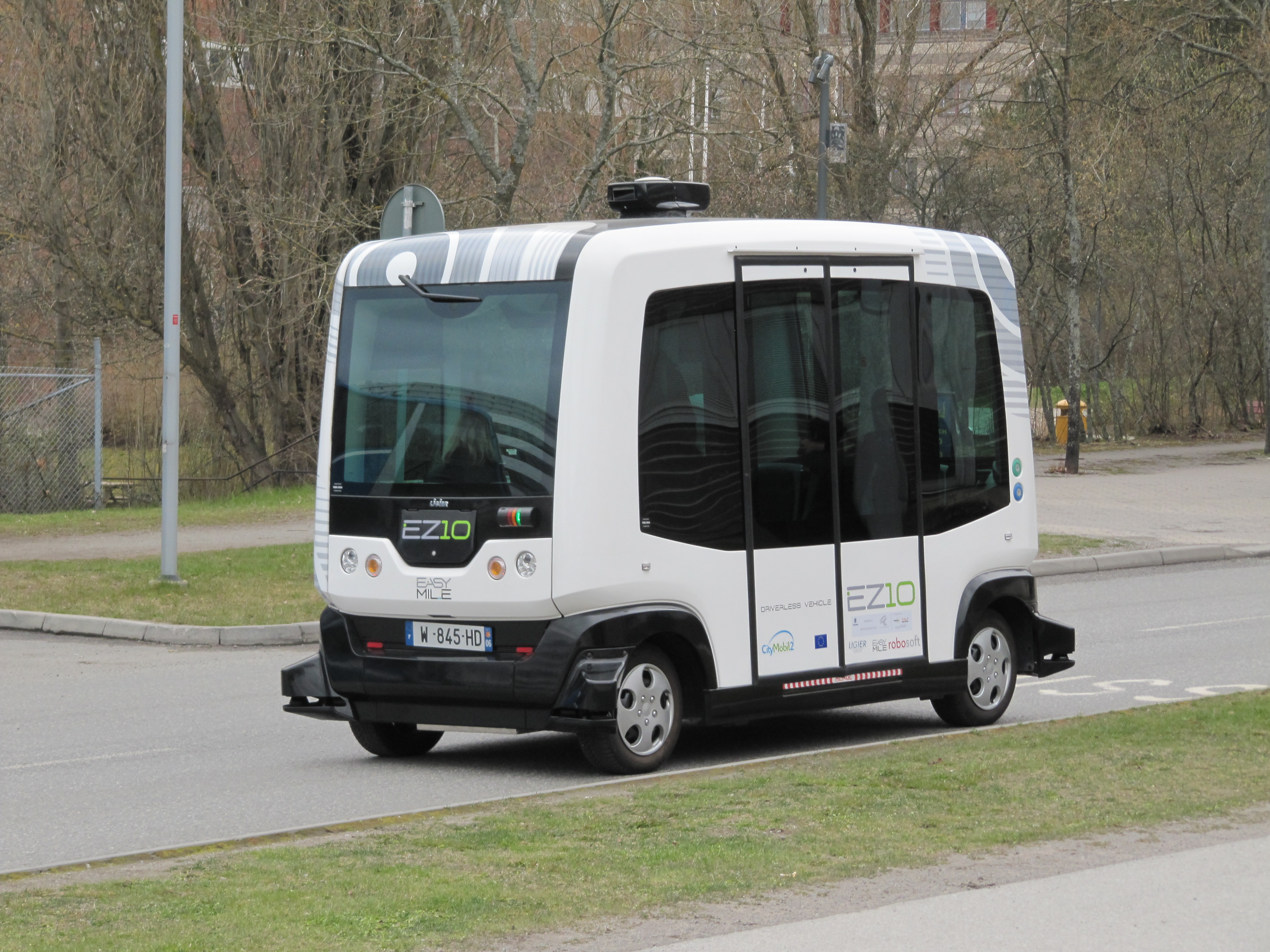

Overview
- Manufacturer: EasyMile

Body and chassis
- Class: Autonomous shuttle
- Body style: Minibus

Powertrain
- Electric motor: Propulsion engine (electric asynchronous)
- Transmission: Single gear
- Battery: 38.4 kWh Lithium LiFePO4 on 48V tension
- Electric range: Up to 14 hours
- Plug-in charging: onboard charges, 7-hour charging time on average

Dimensions
- Wheelbase: 2,80 meters
- Length: 4 meters
- Width: 2 meters
- Height: 2,75 meters
- Curb weight: 2750 kg (fully loaded)

The EasyMile EZ10 is a battery-powered autonomous electric bus designed and marketed by EasyMile. It seats up to six people and four more passengers may ride standing, or it can accommodate a wheelchair, with the aim of helping to bridge the first mile/last mile of a trip. EZ10 has been deployed in more than 30 cities and 16 countries.

== History ==
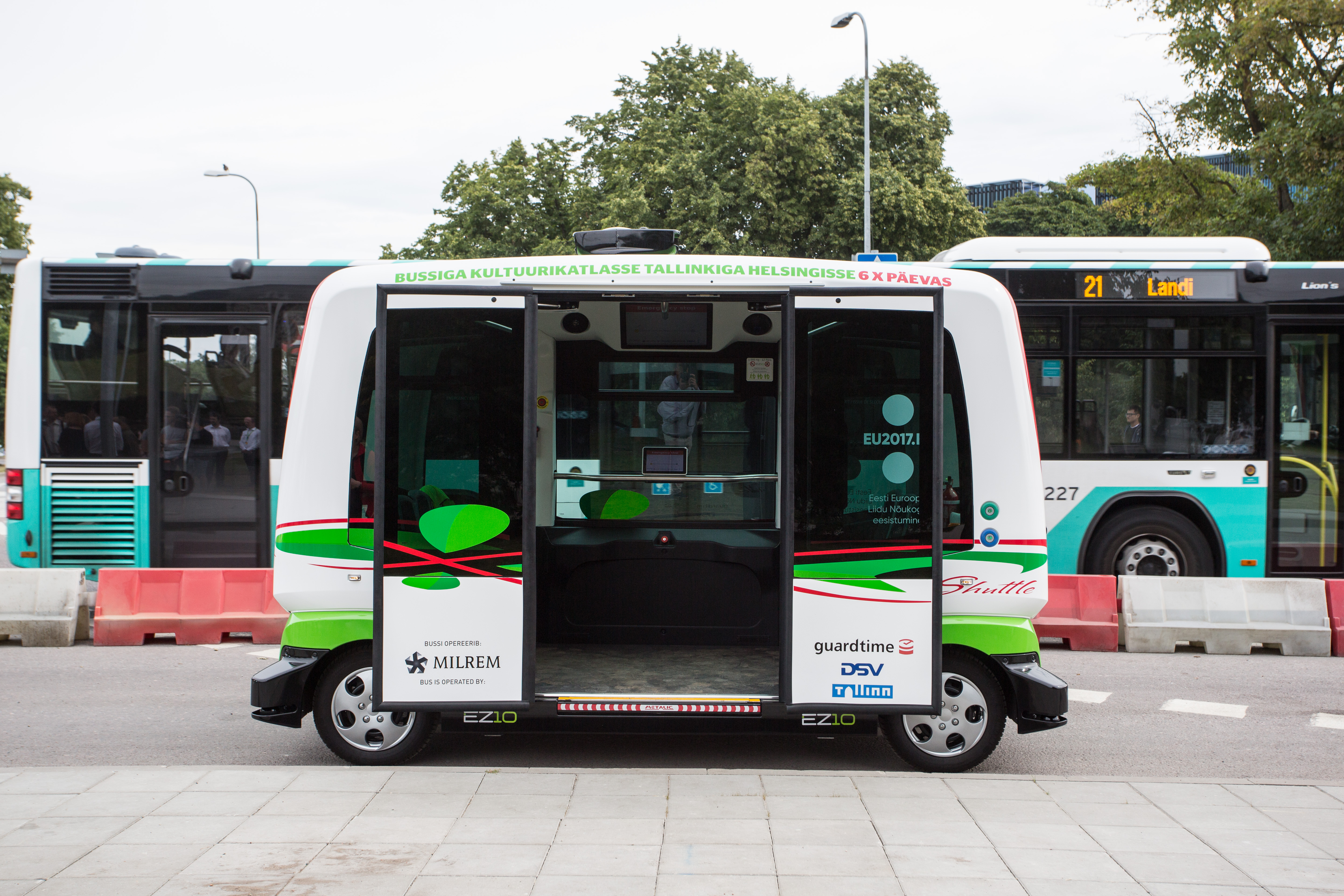
EasyMile EZ10 with doors open

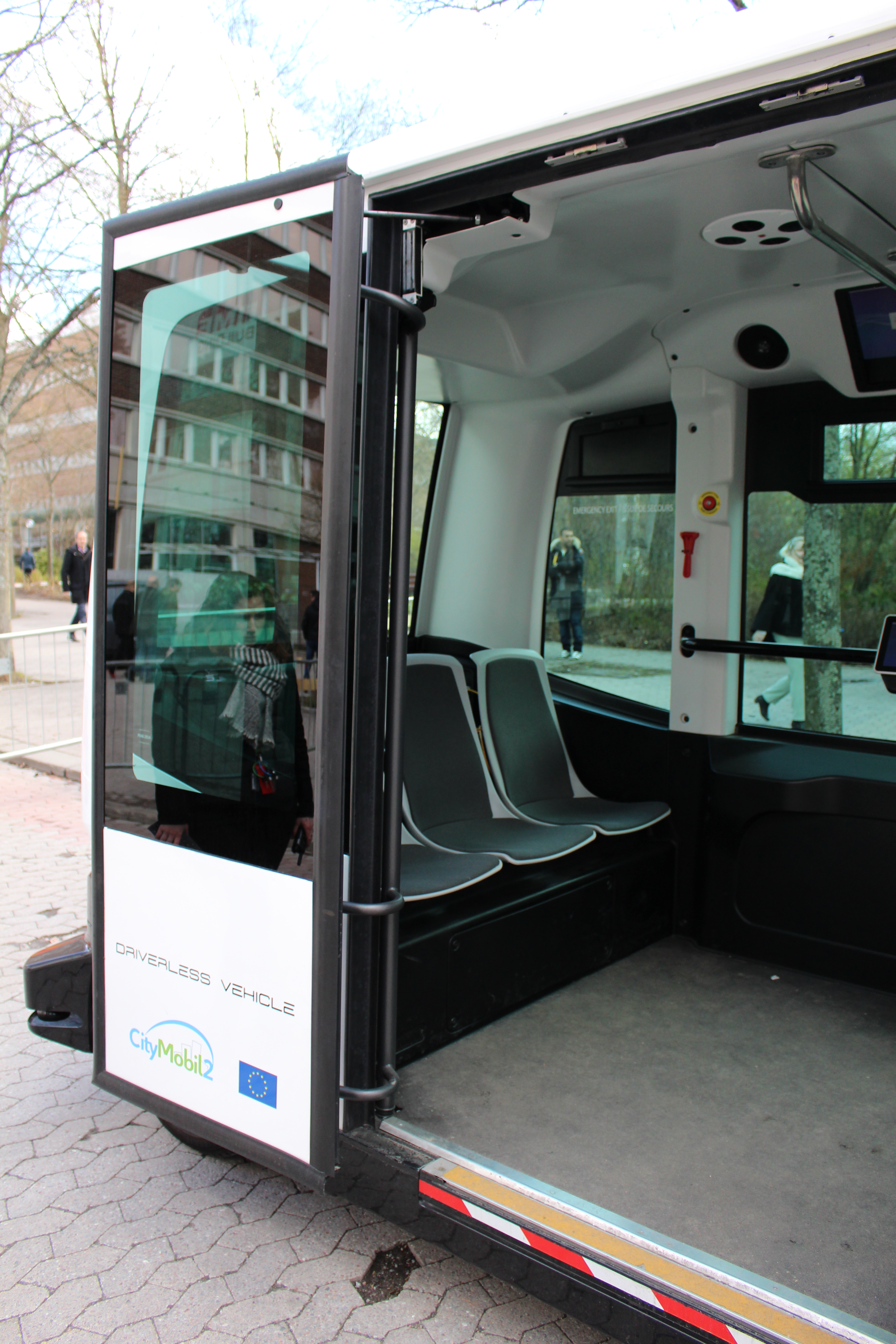
EasyMile EZ10 inside

Founded in June 2014, EasyMile SAS develops and markets autonomous vehicles. It was formally a joint venture formed by Ligier, and Robosoft Technology PTE Ltd (France). EZ10 was first developed with the help of Clermont Auvergne University (Institut Pascal Lab and LAPSCO Lab) in the VIPAFLEET FUI project from 2012 to 2015. Then, it was developed with the help of CityMobil2 project co-funded by the European Union's Seventh Framework Programme for research and technological development (FP7). In January 2017 it was announced that Alstom had invested €14 million in Easymile and the two companies had signed a commercial partnership agreement. In July 2017, Continental also announced an investment in EasyMile.

In July 2019, an EasyMile passenger in Utah required medical attention after falling from a seat due to a sudden stop, prompting the company to put up warning signs and reduce the vehicles' maximum speed. In February 2020, a Smart Columbus (a service in Columbus, Ohio) passenger fell from a seat when an EasyMile vehicle executed an emergency stop from 7 miles per hour (11 km/h). The second incident prompted the National Highway Traffic Safety Administration to suspend EasyMile passenger services nationwide (being used in 10 states) while the incident was investigated.

== Deployments ==
As of end of 2015, the Gelderland county in the Netherlands, plans to put it to use on a 7 km long route between Ede-Wageningen station and the campus of Wageningen University and Research Center. In September 2016, a pilot consisting of a short public transport route served by two EZ10 vehicles started in the village of Appelscha.

In December 2016, the EZ10 began use in the first autonomous vehicle passenger shuttle route in North America, looping through Bishop Ranch Office Park in San Ramon, California, operated by First Transit.

In 2017, EZ10 was introduced on the grounds of National Taiwan University in Taipei, and in Tallinn, Estonia.

In conjunction with Estonia's presidency of the EU Council, the minibus was presented in Tallinn on 14 July 2017 by EasyMile, and the tech companies in Estonia that co-financed the month-and-a-half-long project to bring the shuttle bus to the country. The two buses serve one line officially since 29 July, including a stretch of tram line under reconstruction, and run in the city until the end of August. The line in Tallinn is the first one, where EZ10 buses connect and interact with live traffic.

In February 2020, US vehicle safety regulators ordered a suspension of passenger operations for 16 autonomous shuttles operated by EasyMile after a passenger injury.

The Paris transport authority, RATP Group, started testing EasyMile EZ10 shuttles on regular roads (with an employee on board) in January 2021, taking passengers to Bois de Vincennes on weekends.

On August 10, 2021, EZ10 was deployed on the Colorado School of Mines campus in Golden, Colorado. Nicknamed The Mines Rover, the service consisted of nine buses on three routes connecting locations on campus and in downtown Golden. As of its deployment, it was the largest automated shuttle service in the United States. EZ10 was set to serve the Colorado School of Mines for one year, but was discontinued in December, 2021 after one semester, citing limitations in meeting high expectations of reliability and usefulness.

At the end of September 2021, the EZ10 was deployed at the Kongsberg Technology Park in Norway. The service is fully driverless and there is no more safety driver present during operation.

== See also ==
- Personal Rapid Transit
- Vehicular automation § Passenger Shuttles
