= Vehicular automation =

Automation for various purposes of vehicles

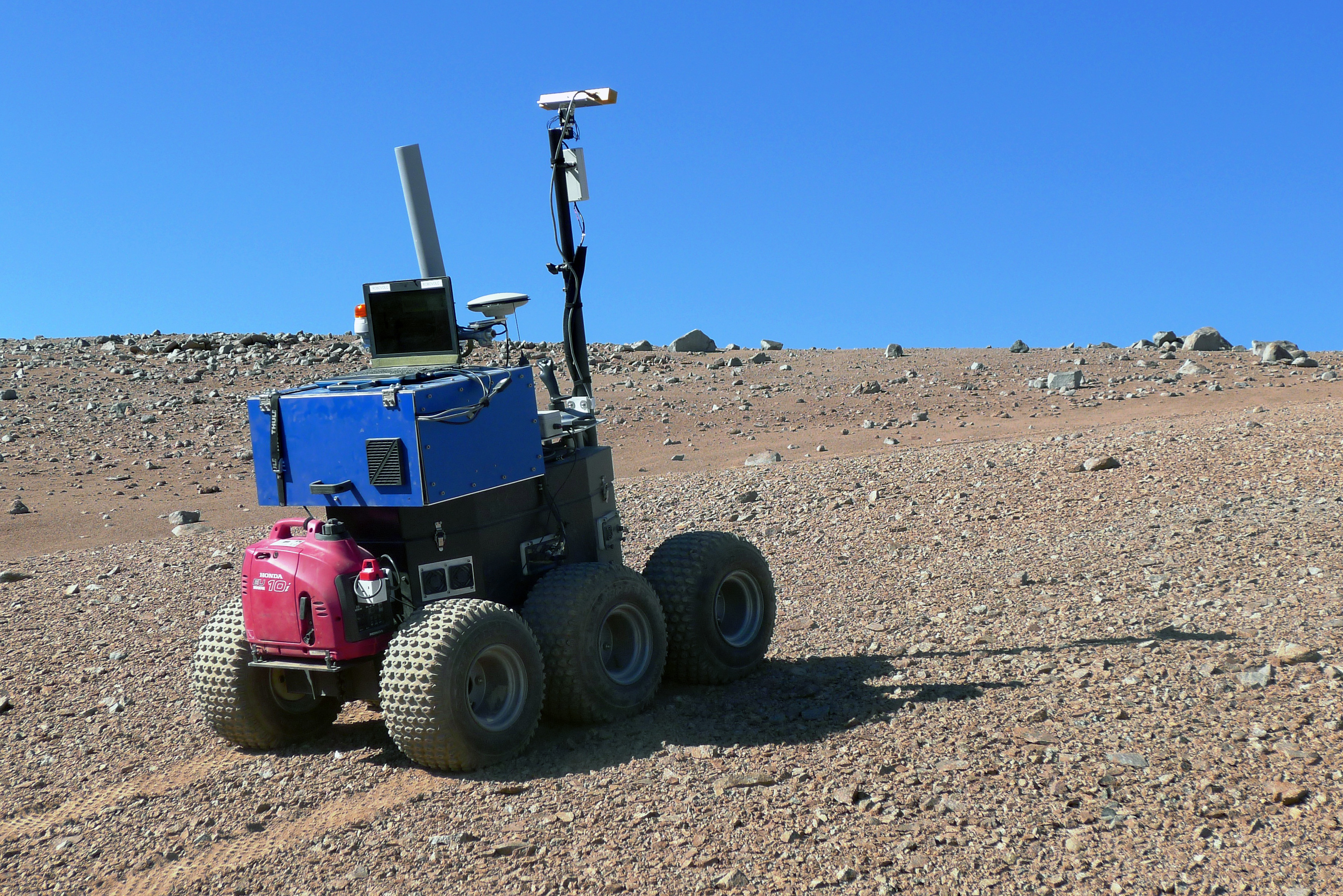
The ESA Seeker autonomous rover during tests at Paranal

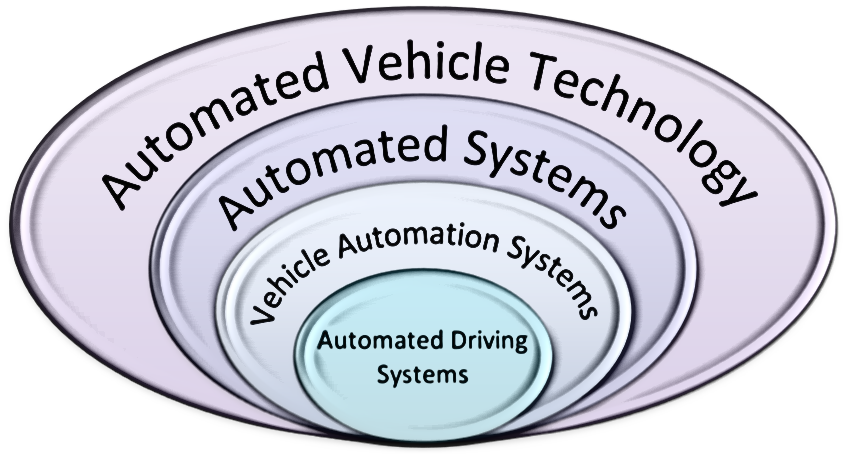
Automated vehicle system technology hierarchy

Vehicular automation is using technology to assist or replace the operator of a vehicle such as a car, truck, aircraft, rocket, military vehicle, or boat. Assisted vehicles are semi-autonomous, whereas vehicles that can travel without a human operator are autonomous. The degree of autonomy may be subject to various constraints such as conditions. Autonomy is enabled by advanced driver-assistance systems (ADAS) of varying capacity.

Related technology includes advanced software, maps, vehicle changes, and outside vehicle support. The benefits of viewing automated driving from a sociotechnical systems perspective has been discussed.

Autonomy presents varying issues for road, air, and marine travel. Roads present the most significant complexity given the unpredictability of the driving environment, including diverse road designs, driving conditions, traffic, obstacles, and geographical/cultural differences.

Autonomy implies that the vehicle is responsible for all perception, monitoring, and control functions.

== SAE autonomy levels ==
The SAE classification of levels is based on the role of the driver, rather than the vehicle's capabilities, although these are related in the form of a "driving mode" (also known as a "driving scenario"). The mode is determined by both an operational design domain (ODD) and a "dynamic driving requirement". The ODD is the circumstance in which the car is driving, and the driving requirement is what the system must do while remaining safe within the boundaries of that ODD. These two things define the SAE level.

J3016 automation levels
Mode	Level	Summary	Description		Responsibility for		
Mode	Level	Summary	Description		Direction & speed	Monitoring environment	Fallback
N/A	0	No Automation	Full-time performance by the driver of all aspects of driving, even when "enhanced by warning or intervention systems"		Driver	Driver	Driver
Some	1	Driver assistance	Driving mode-specific control by an ADAS of either steering or speed	ADAS uses information about the driving environment; driver is expected to perform all other driving tasks.	Driver	Driver	Driver
Some	1	Driver assistance	Driving mode-specific control by an ADAS of either steering or speed	ADAS uses information about the driving environment; driver is expected to perform all other driving tasks.	System	Driver	Driver
Some	2	Partial automation	Driving mode-specific execution by one or more ADAS for both steering and speed	ADAS uses information about the driving environment; driver is expected to perform all other driving tasks.	System	Driver	Driver
Some	3	Conditional automation	Driving mode-specific control by an ADAS of all aspects of driving	Driver must appropriately respond to a request to intervene.	System	System	Driver
Many	4	High automation	Driving mode-specific control by an ADAS of all aspects of driving	If a driver does not respond appropriately to a request to intervene, the car can stop safely.	System	System	System
All	5	Full automation	Driving mode-specific control by an ADAS of all aspects of driving	System controls the vehicle under all conditions and circumstances.	System	System	System

== Technology ==
=== Software ===
Autonomous vehicle software generally contains several different modules that work together to enable self-driving capabilities. The perception module ingests and processes data from various sensors, such cameras, LIDAR, RADAR, and ultrasonic SONAR, to create a comprehensive understanding of the vehicle's surroundings. The localization module uses 3D point cloud data, GPS, IMU, and mapping information to determine the vehicle's precise position, including its orientation, velocity, and angular rate. The planning module takes inputs from both perception and localization to compute actions to take, such as velocity and steering angle outputs. These modules are typically supported by machine learning algorithms, particularly deep neural networks, which enable the vehicle to detect objects, interpret traffic patterns, and make real-time decisions. Furthermore, modern autonomous driving systems increasingly employ sensor fusion techniques that combine data from multiple sensors to improve accuracy and reliability in different environmental conditions.

=== Perception ===
The perception system is responsible for observing the environment. It must identify everything that could affect the trip, including other vehicles, pedestrians, cyclists, their movements, road conditions, obstacles, and other issues. Various makers use cameras, radar, lidar, sonar, and microphones that can collaboratively minimize errors.

=== Navigation ===
Navigation systems are a necessary element in autonomous vehicles. Global navigation satellite systems (GNSS) are used for navigation by air, water, and land vehicles, particularly for off-road navigation.

For road vehicles, two approaches are prominent. One is to use maps that hold data about lanes and intersections, relying on the vehicle's perception system to fill in the details. The other is to use highly detailed maps that reduce the scope of real-time decision-making but require significant maintenance as the environment evolves. Some systems crowdsource their map updates, using the vehicles themselves to update the map to reflect changes such as construction or traffic used by the entire vehicle fleet.

Another potential source of information is the environment itself. Traffic data may be supplied by roadside monitoring systems and used to route vehicles to best use a limited road system. Additionally, modern GNSS enhancement technologies, such as real-time kinematic (RTK) and precise point positioning (PPP), enhance the accuracy of vehicle positioning to sub-meter level precision, which is crucial for autonomous navigation and decision-making.

== History ==
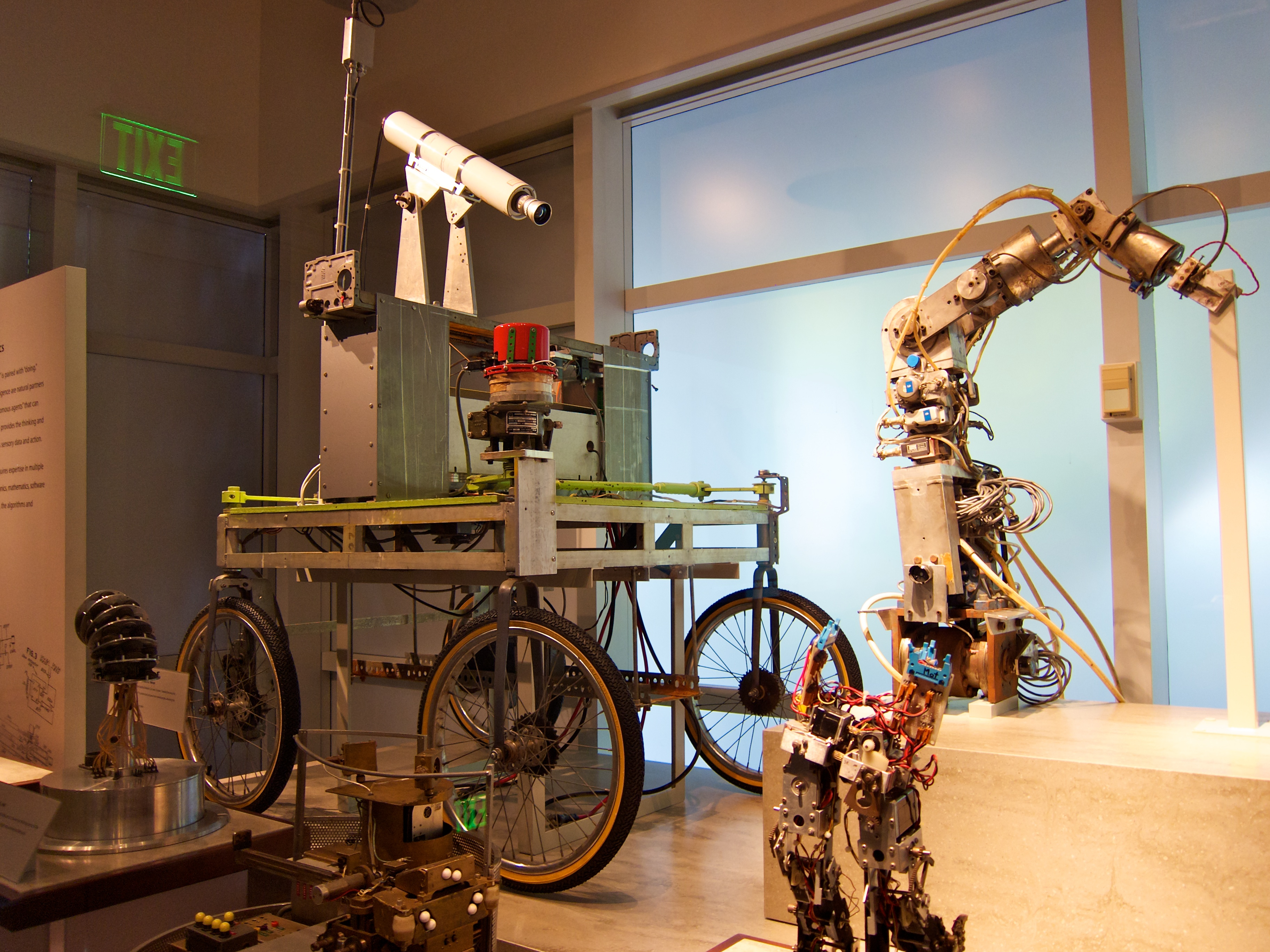
Stanford Cart and Hydraulic Arm

The "Stanford Cart", created by Hans Moravec in the late 1970s while he was a graduate student, was the first experimental autonomous vehicle. It was a precursor to both NASA's Moon and Mars Lander projects as it was known at the time that radio signal lag times would have made anything other than autonomous control impractical. The box rested on 4 bicycle wheels, and had a camera, battery and a radio antenna connecting it wirelessly to a remote computer. It could also be steered remotely. Morovic was able to get the Cart to navigate around large obstacles in a 100 foot long room, albeit it would take 5 hours as the cart would frequently stop as the computer processed images which it analyzed and then responded with navigation instructions.

Approximately 20 years later the Robotics Lab at Carnegie Mellon University developed ALVINN (Autonomous Land vehicle in a Neural Network) a vehicle with 3 onboard Sun Microsystems computers that, using a camera and a laser range finder, could slowly drive itself down a road by monitoring the white divider line.

Automated vehicles in European Union legislation refer specifically to road vehicles (car, truck, or bus). For those vehicles, a specific difference is legally defined between advanced driver-assistance system and autonomous/automated vehicles, based on liability differences.

AAA Foundation for Traffic Safety tested two automatic emergency braking systems: some designed to prevent crashes and others that aim to make a crash less severe. The test looked at popular models like the 2016 Volvo XC90, Subaru Legacy, Lincoln MKX, Honda Civic, and Volkswagen Passat. Researchers tested how well each system stopped when approaching moving and nonmoving targets. It found that systems capable of preventing crashes reduced vehicle speeds by twice that of the systems designed to mitigate crash severity. When the two test vehicles traveled within 30 mph of each other, even those designed to lessen crash severity avoided crashes 60 percent of the time.

=== Sartre ===
The SAfe Road TRains for the Environment (Sartre) project's goal was to enable platooning, in which a line of cars and trucks (a "train") follow a human-driven vehicle. Trains were predicted to provide comfort and allow the following vehicles to travel safely to a destination. Human drivers encountering a train could join and delegate driving to the human driver.

=== Tests ===
Self-driving Uber vehicles were tested in Pittsburgh, Pennsylvania. The tests were paused after an autonomous car killed a woman in Arizona. Automated busses have been tested in California. In San Diego, California, an automated bus test used magnetic markers. The longitudinal control of automated truck platoons used millimeter wave radio and radar. Waymo and Tesla have conducted tests. Tesla FSD allows drivers to enter a destination and let the car take over.

=== Risks and liabilities ===
Ford offers Blue Cruise, technology that allows geofenced cars to drive autonomously.

Drivers are directed to stay attentive, and safety warnings are implemented to alert the driver when corrective action is needed. Tesla, Incorporated has one recorded incident that resulted in a fatality involving the automated driving system in the Tesla Model S. The accident report reveals the accident was a result of the driver being inattentive and the autopilot system not recognizing the obstruction ahead. Tesla has also had multiple instances where the vehicle crashed into a garage door. According to the book "The Driver in the Driverless Car: How Your Technology Choices Create the Future," Tesla automatically performs an update overnight. The morning after the update, the driver used his app to "summon" his car, and it crashed into his garage door.

Another flaw with automated driving systems is that unpredictable events, such as weather or the driving behavior of others, may cause fatal accidents due to sensors that monitor the surroundings of the vehicle not being able to provide corrective action.

To overcome some of the challenges for automated driving systems, novel methodologies based on virtual testing, traffic flow simulation and digital prototypes have been proposed, especially when novel algorithms based on Artificial Intelligence approaches are employed which require extensive training and validation data sets.

Implementing automated driving systems poses the possibility of changing built environments in urban areas, such as expanding the suburban regions due to the increased ease of mobility.

== Challenges ==
Around 2015, several self-driving car companies including Nissan and Toyota promised self-driving cars by 2020. However, the predictions turned out to be far too optimistic.

There are still many obstacles in developing fully autonomous Level 5 vehicles, which is the ability to operate in any conditions. Currently, companies are focused on Level 4 automation, which is able to operate under certain environmental circumstances.

There is still debate about what an autonomous vehicle should look like. For example, whether to incorporate lidar to autonomous driving systems is still being argued. Some researchers have come up with algorithms using camera-only data that achieve the performance that rival those of lidar. On the other hand, camera-only data sometimes draw inaccurate bounding boxes, and thus lead to poor predictions. This is due to the nature of superficial information that stereo cameras provide, whereas incorporating lidar gives autonomous vehicles precise distance to each point on the vehicle.

=== Technical challenges ===
- Software Integration: Because of the large number of sensors and safety processes required by autonomous vehicles, software integration remains a challenging task. A robust autonomous vehicle should ensure that the integration of hardware and software can recover from component failures.
- Prediction and trust among autonomous vehicles: Fully autonomous cars should be able to anticipate the actions of other cars like humans do. Human drivers are great at predicting other drivers' behaviors, even with a small amount of data such as eye contact or hand gestures. In the first place, the cars should agree on traffic rules, whose turn it is to drive in an intersection, and so on. This scales into a larger issue when there exists both human-operated cars and self-driving cars due to more uncertainties. A robust autonomous vehicle is expected to improve on understanding the environment better to address this issue.
- Scaling up: The coverage of autonomous vehicles testing could not be accurate enough. In cases where heavy traffic and obstruction exist, it requires faster response time or better tracking algorithms from the autonomous vehicles. In cases where unseen objects are encountered, it is important that the algorithms are able to track these objects and avoid collisions.

These features require numerous sensors, many of which rely on micro-electro-mechanical systems (MEMS) to maintain a small size, high efficiency, and low cost. Foremost among MEMS sensors in vehicles are accelerometers and gyroscopes to measure acceleration around multiple orthogonal axes—critical to detecting and controlling the vehicle's motion.

=== Societal challenges ===
One critical step to achieve the implementation of autonomous vehicles is the acceptance by the general public. It provides guidelines for the automobile industry to improve their design and technology. Studies have shown that many people believe that using autonomous vehicles is safer, which underlines the necessity for the automobile companies to assure that autonomous vehicles improve safety benefits. The TAM research model breaks down important factors that affect the consumer's acceptance into: usefulness, ease to use, trust, and social influence.

- The usefulness factor studies whether or not autonomous vehicles are useful in that they provide benefits that save consumers' time and make their lives simpler. How well the consumers believe autonomous vehicles will be useful compared to other forms of transportation solutions is a determining factor.
- The ease to use factor studies the user-friendliness of the autonomous vehicles. While the notion that consumers care more about ease to use than safety has been challenged. It still remains an important factor that has indirect effects on the public's intention to use autonomous vehicles.
- The trust factor studies the safety, data privacy and security protection of autonomous vehicles. A more trusted system has a positive impact on the consumer's decision to use autonomous vehicles.
- The social influence factor studies whether the influence of others would influence consumer's likelihood of having autonomous vehicles. Studies have shown that the social influence factor is positively related to behavioral intention. This might be due to the fact that cars traditionally serve as a status symbol that represents one's intent to use and his social environment.

=== Regulatory challenges ===
Real-time testing of autonomous vehicles is an inevitable part of the process. At the same time, vehicular automation regulators are faced with challenges to protect public safety and yet allow autonomous vehicle companies to test their products. Groups representing autonomous vehicle companies are resisting most regulations, whereas groups representing vulnerable road users and traffic safety are pushing for regulatory barriers. To improve traffic safety, the regulators are encouraged to find a middle ground that protects the public from immature technology while allowing autonomous vehicle companies to test the implementation of their systems. Regulators face daunting challenges such as jurisdictional ambiguities, the rapid obsolescence of current technologies and the lack of future-looking cost-benefit data to support regulatory development. There have also been proposals to adopt the aviation automation safety regulatory knowledge into the discussions of safe implementation of autonomous vehicles, due to the experience that has been gained over the decades by the aviation sector on safety topics.

== Ground vehicles ==
In some countries, specific laws and regulations apply to road traffic motor vehicles (such as cars, bus and trucks) while other laws and regulations apply to other ground vehicles such as tram, train or automated guided vehicles making them to operate in different environments and conditions.

=== Road traffic vehicles ===
An automated driving system is defined in a proposed amendment to Article 1 of the Vienna Convention on Road Traffic:

(ab) "Automated driving system" refers to a vehicle system that uses both hardware and software to exercise dynamic control of a vehicle on a sustained basis.

(ac) "Dynamic control" refers to carrying out all the real-time operational and tactical functions required to move the vehicle. This includes controlling the vehicle's lateral and longitudinal motion, monitoring the road environment, responding to events in the road traffic environment, and planning and signalling for manoeuvres.

This amendment will enter into force on 14 July 2022, unless it is rejected before 13 January 2022.

An automated driving feature must be described sufficiently clearly so that it is distinguished from an assisted driving feature.

— SMMT

There are two clear states – a vehicle is either assisted with a driver being supported by technology or automated where the technology is effectively and safely replacing the driver.

— SMMT

Ground vehicles employing automation and teleoperation include shipyard gantries, mining trucks, bomb-disposal robots, robotic insects, and driverless tractors.

There are many autonomous and semi-autonomous ground vehicles being made for the purpose of transporting passengers. One such example is the free-ranging on grid (FROG) technology which consists of autonomous vehicles, a magnetic track and a supervisory system. The FROG system is deployed for industrial purposes in factory sites and has been in use since 1999 on the ParkShuttle, a PRT-style public transport system in the city of Capelle aan den IJssel to connect the Rivium business park with the neighboring city of Rotterdam (where the route terminates at the Kralingse Zoom metro station). The system experienced a crash in 2005 that proved to be caused by a human error.

Applications for automation in ground vehicles include the following:

- Vehicle tracking system system ESITrack, Lojack.
- Rear-view alarm, to detect obstacles behind.
- Anti-lock braking system (ABS) (also Emergency Braking Assistance (EBA)), often coupled with Electronic brake force distribution (EBD), which prevents the brakes from locking and losing traction while braking. This shortens stopping distances in most cases and, more importantly, allows the driver to steer the vehicle while braking.
- Traction control system (TCS) actuates brakes or reduces throttle to restore traction if driven wheels begin to spin.
- Four wheel drive (AWD) with a centre differential. Distributing power to all four wheels lessens the chances of wheel spin. It also suffers less from oversteer and understeer.
- Electronic Stability Control (ESC) (also known for Mercedes-Benz proprietary Electronic Stability Program (ESP), Acceleration Slip Regulation (ASR) and Electronic differential lock (EDL)). Uses various sensors to intervene when the car senses a possible loss of control. The car's control unit can reduce power from the engine and even apply the brakes on individual wheels to prevent the car from understeering or oversteering.
- Dynamic steering response (DSR) corrects the rate of power steering system to adapt it to vehicle's speed and road conditions.

Research is ongoing and prototypes of autonomous ground vehicles exist.

=== Cars ===
Extensive automation for cars focuses on either introducing robotic cars or modifying modern car designs to be semi-autonomous.

Semi-autonomous designs could be implemented sooner as they rely less on technology that is still at the forefront of research. An example is the dual mode monorail. Groups such as RUF (Denmark) and TriTrack (USA) are working on projects consisting of specialized private cars that are driven manually on normal roads but also that dock onto a monorail/guideway along which they are driven autonomously.

As a method of automating cars without extensively modifying the cars as much as a robotic car, Automated highway systems (AHS) aims to construct lanes on highways that would be equipped with, for example, magnets to guide the vehicles. Automation vehicles have auto-brakes named as Auto Vehicles Braking System (AVBS). Highway computers would manage the traffic and direct the cars to avoid crashes.

In 2006, The European Commission has established a smart car development program called the Intelligent Car Flagship Initiative. The goals of that program include:

- Adaptive cruise control
- Lane departure warning system
- Project AWAKE for drowsy drivers

There are further uses for automation in relation to cars. These include:

- Assured Clear Distance Ahead
- Adaptive headlamps
- Advanced Automatic Collision Notification, such as OnStar
- Intelligent Parking Assist System
- Automatic Parking
- Automotive night vision with pedestrian detection
- Blind spot monitoring
- Driver Monitoring System
- Robotic car or self-driving car which may result in less-stressed "drivers", higher efficiency (the driver can do something else), increased safety and less pollution (e.g. via completely automated fuel control)
- Precrash system
- Safe speed governing
- Traffic sign recognition
- Following another car on a motorway – "enhanced" or "adaptive" cruise control, as used by Ford Motor Company and Vauxhall
- Distance control assist – as developed by Nissan
- Dead man's switch – there is a move to introduce deadman's braking into automotive application, primarily heavy vehicles, and there may also be a need to add penalty switches to cruise controls.

Singapore also announced a set of provisional national standards on January 31, 2019, to guide the autonomous vehicle industry. The standards, known as Technical Reference 68 (TR68), will promote the safe deployment of fully driverless vehicles in Singapore, according to a joint press release by Enterprise Singapore (ESG), Land Transport Authority (LTA), Standards Development Organisation and Singapore Standards Council (SSC).

=== Shuttle ===
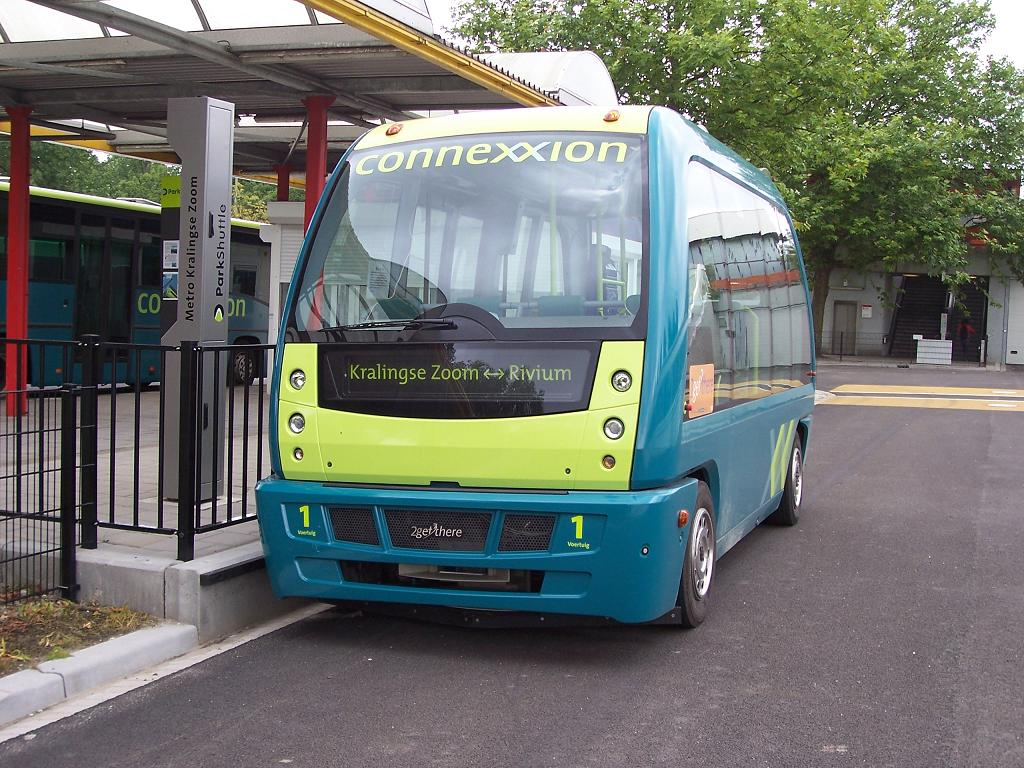
Parkshuttle

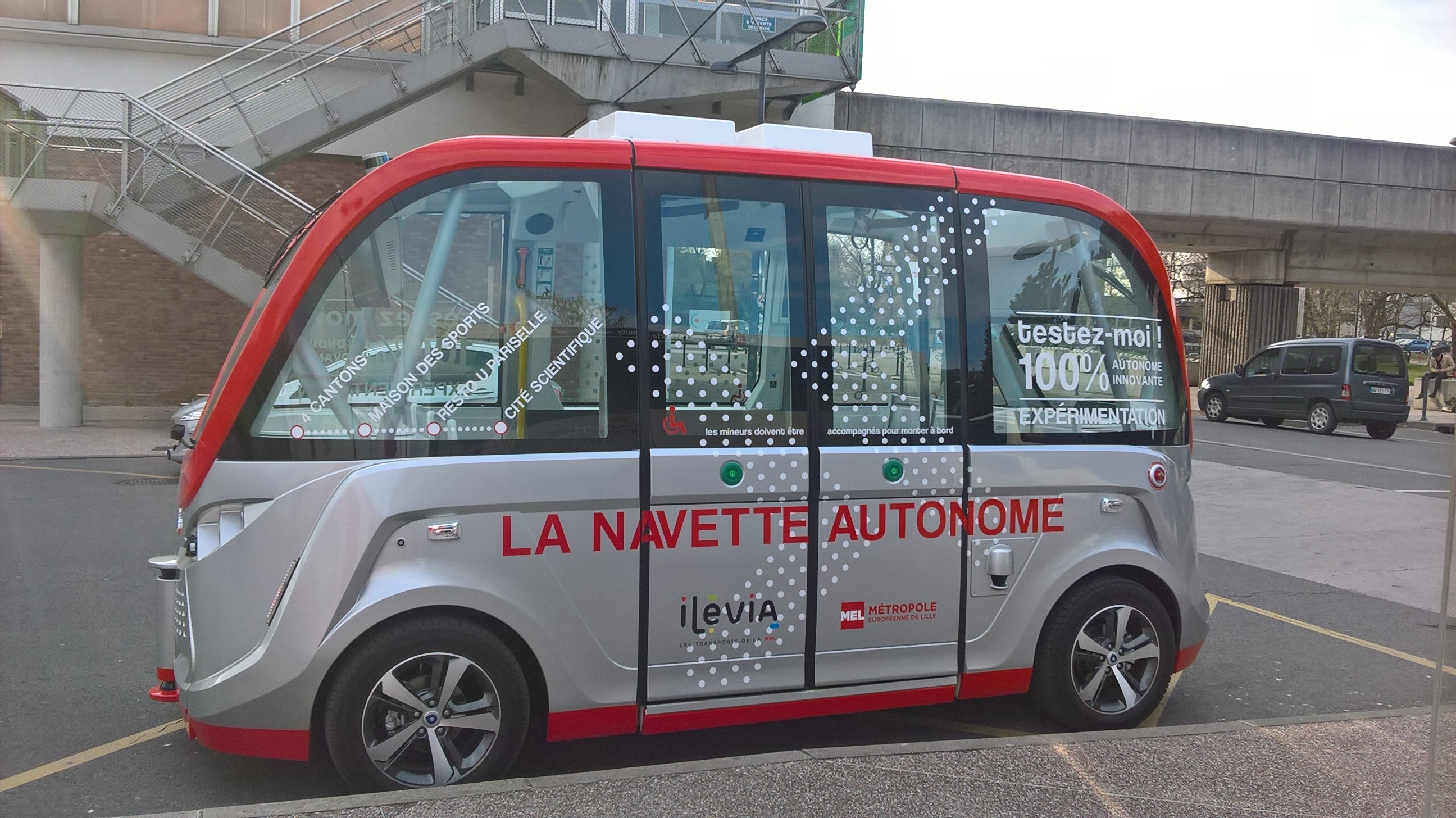
Navya Autonom Shuttle

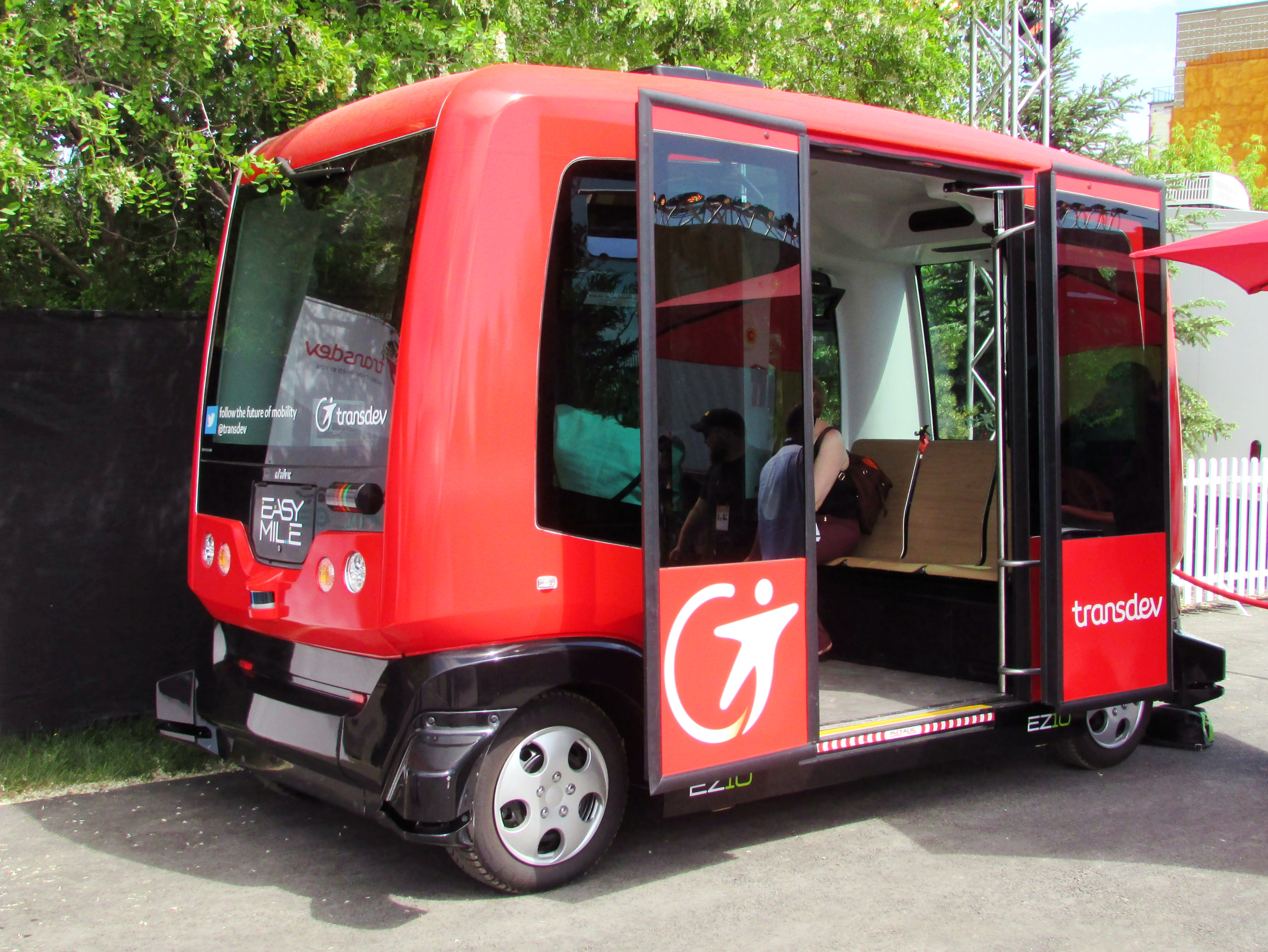
Easymile EZ10

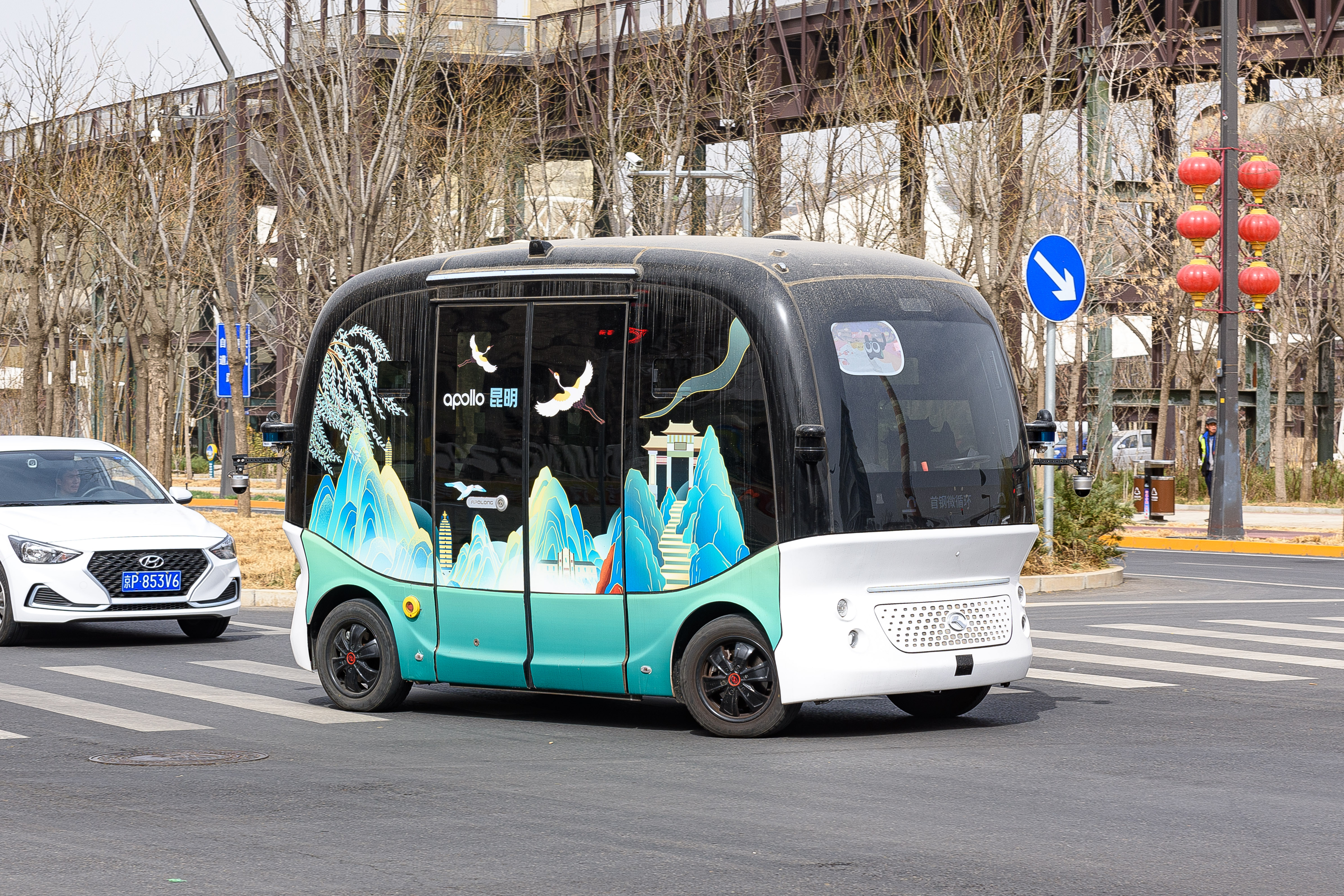
King Long Apolong

Since 1999, the 12-seat/10-standing ParkShuttle has been operating on an 1.8 kilometres (1.1 mi) exclusive right of way in the city of Capelle aan den IJssel in The Netherlands. The system uses small magnets in the road surface to allow the vehicle to determine its position. The use of shared autonomous vehicles was trialed around 2012 in a hospital car park in Portugal. From 2012 to 2016, the European Union funded CityMobil2 project examined the use of shared autonomous vehicles and passenger experience including short term trials in seven cities. This project led to the development of the EasyMile EZ10.

In the 2010s, self-driving shuttle became able to run in mixed traffic without the need for embedded guidance markers. So far the focus has been on low speed, 20 miles per hour (32 km/h), with short, fixed routes for the "last mile" of journeys. This means issues of collision avoidance and safety are significantly less challenging than those for automated cars, which seek to match the performance of conventional vehicles. Many trials have been undertaken, mainly on quiet roads with little traffic or on public pathways or private roadways and specialised test sites. The capacity of different models varies significantly, between 6-seats and 20-seats. (Above this size there are conventional buses that have driverless technology installed.)

In December 2016, the Jacksonville Transportation Authority has announced its intention to replace the Jacksonville Skyway monorail with driverless vehicles that would run on the existing elevated superstructure as well as continue onto ordinary roads. The project has since been named the "Ultimate Urban Circulator" or "U2C" and testing has been carried out on shuttles from six different manufacturers. The cost of the project is estimated at $379 million.

In January 2017, it was announced the ParkShuttle system in the Netherlands will be renewed and expanded including extending the route network beyond the exclusive right of way so vehicles will run in mixed traffic on ordinary roads. The plans were delayed and the extension into mixed traffic was expected in 2021.

In July 2018, Baidu stated it had built 100 of its 8-seat Apolong model, with plans for commercial sales. As of July 2021, they had not gone into volume production.

In August 2020, it was reported there were 25 autonomous shuttle manufacturers, including the 2GetThere, Local Motors, Navya, Baidu, Easymile, Toyota and Ohmio.

In December 2020, Toyota showcased its 20-passenger "e-Palette" vehicle, which is due to be used at the 2021 Tokyo Olympic Games. Toyota announced it intends to have the vehicle available for commercial applications before 2025.

In January 2021, Navya released an investor report which predicted global autonomous shuttle sales will reach 12,600 units by 2025, with a market value of EUR 1.7 billion.

In June 2021, Chinese maker Yutong claimed to have delivered 100 models of its 10-seat Xiaoyu 2.0 autonomous bus for use in Zhengzhou. Testing has been carried out in a number of cities since 2019 with trials open to the public planned for July 2021.

Self-driving shuttles are already in use on some private roads, such as at the Yutong factory in Zhengzhou where they are used to transport workers between buildings of the world's largest bus factory.

In Hong Kong, the police and other workers use driverless vehicles.

==== Trials ====
A large number of trials have been conducted since 2016, with most involving only one vehicle on a short route for a short period of time and with an onboard conductor. The purpose of the trials has been to both provide technical data and to familiarize the public with the driverless technology. A 2021 survey of over 100 shuttle experiments across Europe concluded that low speed – 15–20 kilometres per hour (9.3–12.4 mph) – was the major barrier to implementation of autonomous shuttle buses. The current cost of the vehicles at €280,000 and the need for onboard attendants were also issues.

Company/Location	Details
Navya "Arma" in Neuhausen am Rheinfall	In October 2016, BestMile started trials in Neuhausen am Rheinfall, claiming to be the world's first solution for managing hybrid fleets with both autonomous and non-autonomous vehicles. The test ended in October 2021.
Local Motors "Olli"	At the end of 2016, the Olli was tested in Washington D.C. In 2020, a four-month trial was undertaken at the United Nations ITCILO campus in Turin, Italy to provide transport shuttle to employees and guests within the campus.
Navya "Autonom"	Navya claimed in May 2017 to have carried almost 150,000 passengers across Europe with trials in Sion, Cologne, Doha, Bordeaux and the nuclear power plant at Civaux as well as Las Vegas and Perth. Ongoing public trials are underway in Lyon, Val Thorens and Masdar City. Other trials on private sites are underway at University of Michigan since 2016, at Salford University and the Fukushima Daini Nuclear Power Plant since 2018.
Texas A&M	In August 2017, a driverless four seat shuttle was trialed at Texas A&M university as part of its "Transportation Technology Initiative" in a project run by academics and students on the campus. Another trial, this time using Navya vehicles, was run in 2019 from September to November.
RDM Group "LUTZ Pathfinder"	In October 2017, RDM Group began a trial service with two seat vehicles between Trumpington Park and Ride and Cambridge railway station along the guided busway, for possible use as an after hours service once the regular bus service has stopped each day.
EasyMile "EZ10"	EasyMile has had longer term trials at Wageningen University and Lausanne as well as short trials in Darwin, Dubai, Helsinki, San Sebastián, Sophia Antipolis, Bordeaux and Tapei In December 2017, a trial began in Denver running at 5 miles per hour (8.0 km/h) on a dedicated stretch of road. EasyMile was operating in ten U.S. states, including California, Florida, Texas, Ohio, Utah, and Virginia before U.S. service was suspended after a February 2020 injury. In August 2020 EasyMile was operating shuttles in 16 cities across the United States, including Salt Lake City, Columbus, Ohio, and Corpus Christi, Texas. In October 2020 a new trial was launched in Fairfax, Virginia. In August 2021 a one-year trial was launched at the Colorado School of Mines in Golden, Colorado. The trial uses nine vehicles (with seven active at any time) and provides a 5–10 minute service along three routes at a maximum speed of 12 mph (19 km/h). At the time of launch this was the largest such trial in the United States. In November 2021, EasyMile became the first driverless solutions provider in Europe authorized to operate at Level 4 in mixed traffic, on a public road. "EZ10" has been making test runs on a medical campus in the southwestern city of Toulouse since March.
Westfield Autonomous Vehicles "POD"	In 2017 and 2018, using a modified version of the UltraPRT called "POD", four vehicles were used as part of the GATEway project trial conducted in Greenwich in south London on a 3.4 kilometres (2.1 mi) route. A number of other trials have been conducted in Birmingham, Manchester, Lake District National Park, University of the West of England and Filton Airfield.
Next Future Transportation "pods" in Dubai	In February 2018, the ten passenger (six seated), 12 miles per hour (19 km/h), autonomous pods which are capable of joining to form a bus, were demonstrated at the World Government Summit in Dubai. The demonstration was a collaboration with between Next-Future and Dubai's Roads and Transport Authority and the vehicles are under consideration for deployment there.
"Apolong/Apollo"	In July 2018, a driverless eight seater shuttle bus was trialed at the 2018 Shanghai expo after tests in Xiamen and Chongqing cities as part of Project Apollo, a mass-produced autonomous vehicle project launched by a consortium including Baidu.
Jacksonville Transportation Authority	Since December 2018, the Jacksonville Transportation Authority has been using a 'test and learn' site at the Florida State College at Jacksonville to evaluate vehicles from different vendors as part of its plan for the Ultimate Urban Circulator (U^{2}C). Among the six vehicles tested are the Local Motors "Olli 2.0", Navya "Autonom" and EasyMile "EZ10".
2getthere "ParkShuttle" in Brussels	In 2019, trials were held at Brussels Airport and at Nanyang Technological University in Singapore.
Ohmio "Lift" in Christchurch	In 2019, Trials with their 15-person shuttle were conducted in New Zealand at Christchurch Airport and at the Christchurch Botanic Gardens in 2020.
Yutong "Xioayu"	Testing with the first generation vehicle in 2019 at the Boao Forum for Asia and in Zhengzhou. The 10-seat second generation vehicle has been delivered to Guangzhou, Nanjing, Zhengzhou, Sansha, Changsha with public trials due to commence in July 2021 in Zhengzhou.
ARTC "WinBus" in Changhua city	In July 2020, a trial service began in Changhua city in Taiwan, connecting four tourism factories in Changhua Coastal Industrial Park along a 7.5 km (4.7 mi), with plans to extend the route to 12.6 km (7.8 mi) to serve tourist destinations. In January 2021, Level 4 "WinBus" got a license for one-year experimental sandbox operation.
Yamaha Motor "Land Car" based "ZEN drive Pilot" in Eiheiji town, Fukui prefecture, Japan	In December 2020, Eiheiji town started test operation of driverless autonomous driving mobility services by making use of a remotely-operated autonomous driving system. AIST Human-Centered Mobility Research Center modified Yamaha Motor's electric "Land Car" and the tracing road of an abandoned Eiheiji railway line. This system was legally approved as Level 3. In March 2023, "ZEN drive Pilot" became the first legally approved Level 4 Automatic operation device under the amended "Road Traffic Act" of 2023.
WeRide "Mini Robobus"	In January 2021, WeRide began testing its Mini Robobus on Guangzhou International Bio Island. In June 2021, the company also launched trials at Nanjing.
Toyota "e-Palette" in Chūō, Tokyo	During the 2021 Tokyo Summer Olympics, a fleet of 20 vehicles was used to ferry athletes and others around the Athletes' Village. Each vehicle could carry 20 people or 4 wheelchairs and had a top speed of 20 mph (32 km/h). (The event also used 200 driver operated variants called the "Accessible People Movers (APM)", to take athletes to their events.) On August 27, 2021, Toyota suspended all "e-Pallete" services at the Paralympics after a vehicle collided with and injured a visually impaired pedestrian, and restarted on August 31 with improved safety measures.
Hino "Poncho Long" tuned by Nippon Mobility in Shinjuku, Tokyo	In November 2021, Tokyo Metropolitan Government started three trials. As one of the three, a lead contractor Keio Dentetsu Bus was planned to operate in the central area of the megalopolis.

Vehicle names are in quotes

=== Buses ===
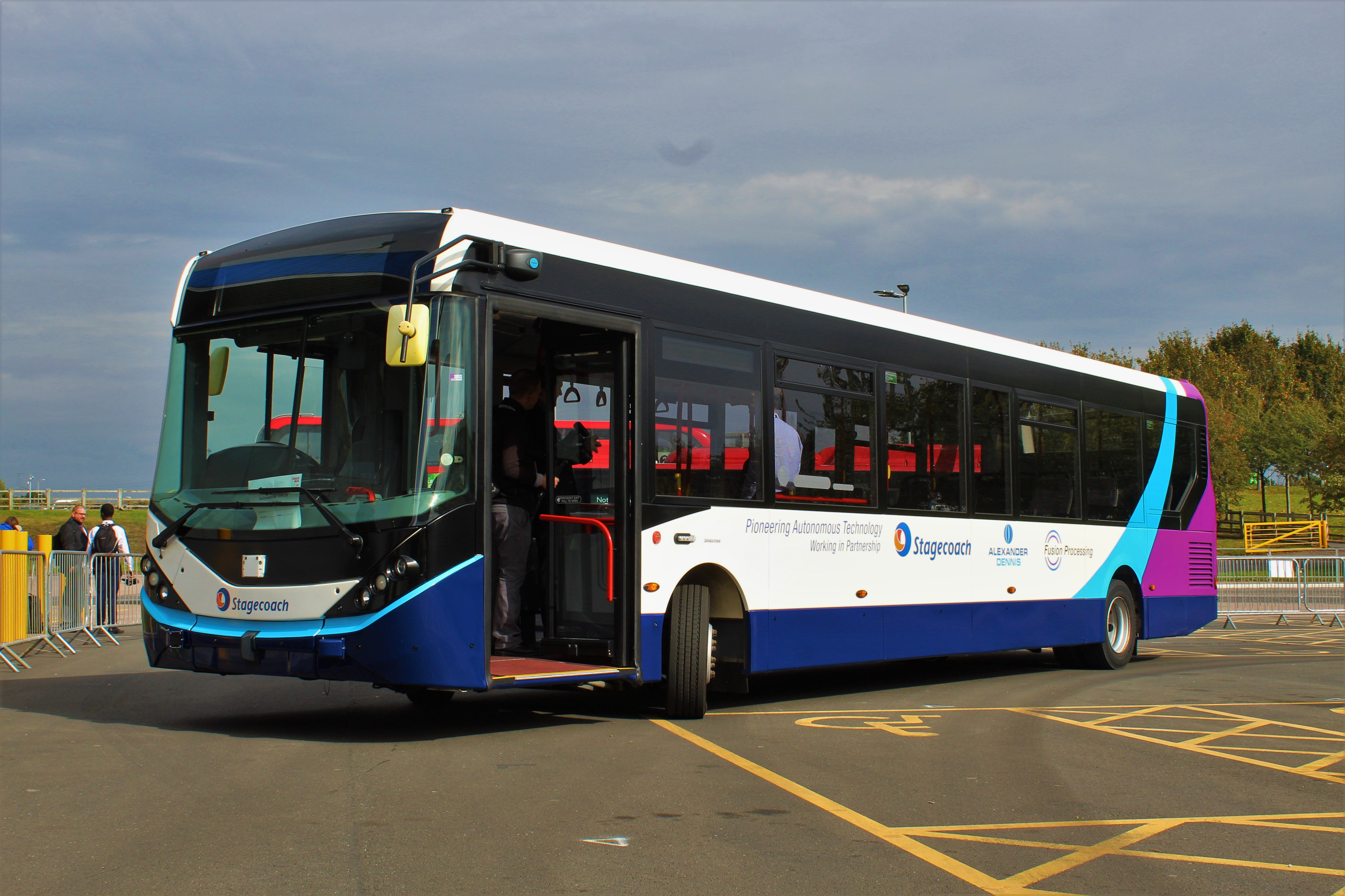
The United Kingdom's first autonomous bus, currently on trial with Stagecoach Manchester

Autonomous buses are proposed, as well as self-driving cars and trucks. Grade 2 level automated minibusses were trialed for a few weeks in Stockholm. China has a small fleet of self-driving public buses in the tech district of Shenzhen, Guangdong.

The first autonomous bus trial in the United Kingdom commenced in mid-2019, with an Alexander Dennis Enviro200 MMC single-decker bus modified with autonomous software from Fusion Processing able to operate in driverless mode within Stagecoach Manchester's Sharston bus depot, performing tasks such as driving to the washing station, refueling point and then parking at a dedicated parking space in the depot. Passenger-carrying driverless bus trials in Scotland commenced in January 2023, with a fleet of five identical vehicles to the Manchester trial used on a 14 miles (23 km) Stagecoach Fife park-and-ride route across the Forth Road Bridge, from the north bank of the Forth to Edinburgh Park station.

Another autonomous trial in Oxfordshire, England, which uses a battery electric Fiat Ducato minibus on a circular service to Milton Park, operated by FirstBus with support from Fusion Processing, Oxfordshire County Council and the University of the West of England, entered full passenger service also in January 2023. The trial route will be extended to Didcot Parkway railway station after acquiring a larger single-decker by the end of 2023.

In July 2020 in Japan, AIST Human-Centered Mobility Research Center with Nippon Koei and Isuzu started a series of demonstration tests for mid-sized buses, Isuzu "Erga Mio" with autonomous driving systems, in five areas; Ōtsu city in Shiga prefecture, Sanda city in Hyōgo Prefecture and other three areas in sequence.

In October 2023, Imagry, an Israeli AI startup, introduced its mapless autonomous driving solution at Busworld Europe, leveraging a real-time image recognition system and a spatial deep convolutional neural network (DCNN) to mimic human driving behavior.

In September 2025, trade publications described the "smartbus" concept in connection with depot-based autonomous bus operation for manoeuvres such as parking, washing, and charging, in coverage of Autonomous Systems. The concept was presented at Busworld Europe later that year. In December 2025, a smartbus pilot involving the public transport operator PKM Gliwice in Poland was reported.

==== Modular autonomous transit ====
Modular autonomous transit is a research concept for public transit using self-driving vehicles with connectable units, or "pods", that can adjust capacity based on passenger demand. Studies suggest these systems could improve efficiency through dynamic routing, with simulations showing reduced travel times in urban networks, though no operational systems existed as of 2025.

=== Trucks ===
The concept for autonomous vehicles has been applied for commercial uses, such as autonomous or nearly autonomous trucks.

Companies such as Suncor Energy, a Canadian energy company, and Rio Tinto Group were among the first to replace human-operated trucks with driverless commercial trucks run by computers. In April 2016, trucks from major manufacturers including Volvo and the Daimler Company completed a week of autonomous driving across Europe, organized by the Dutch, in an effort to get self-driving trucks on the road. With developments in self-driving trucks progressing, U.S. self-driving truck sales is expected to reach 60,000 by 2035 according to a report released by IHS Incorporated in June 2016.

As reported in June 1995 in Popular Science magazine, self-driving trucks were being developed for combat convoys, whereby only the lead truck would be driven by a human and the following trucks would rely on satellite, an inertial guidance system and ground-speed sensors. Caterpillar Incorporated made early developments in 2013 with the Robotics Institute at Carnegie Mellon University to improve efficiency and reduce cost at various mining and construction sites.

In Europe, the Safe Road Trains for the Environment is such an approach.

From PWC's Strategy & Report, self driving trucks will be the source of concern around how this technology will impact around 3 million truck drivers in the US, as well as 4 million employees in support of the trucking economy in gas stations, restaurants, bars and hotels. At the same time, some companies like Starsky, are aiming for Level 3 Autonomy, which would see the driver playing a control role around the truck's environment. The company's project, remote truck driving, would give truck drivers a greater work-life balance, enabling them to avoid long periods away from their home. This would however provoke a potential mismatch between the driver's skills with the technological redefinition of the job.

Companies that buy driverless trucks could massively cut costs: human drivers would no longer be required, companies' liabilities due to truck accidents would diminish, and productivity would increase (as the driverless truck doesn't need to rest). The usage of self driving trucks will go hand in hand with the use of real-time data to optimize both efficiency and productivity of the service delivered, as a way to tackle traffic congestion for example. Driverless trucks could enable new business models that would see deliveries shift from day time to night time or time slots in which traffic is less heavily dense.

==== Suppliers ====
Company	Details
Waymo Semi	In March 2018, Waymo, the automated vehicle company spun off from Google parent company Alphabet Incorporated, announced it was applying its technology to semi trucks. In the announcement, Waymo noted it would be using automated trucks to move freight related to Google's data centers in the Atlanta, Georgia area. The trucks will be manned and operated on public roads.
Uber Semi	In October 2016, Uber completed the first driverless operation of an automated truck on public roads, delivering a trailer of Budweiser beer from Fort Collins, Colorado to Colorado Springs. The run was completed at night on Interstate 25 after extensive testing and system improvements in cooperation with the Colorado State Police. The truck had a human in the cab but not sitting in the driver's seat, while the Colorado State Police provided a rolling closure of the highway. At the time, Uber's automated truck was based primarily on technology developed by Otto, which Uber acquired in August 2016. In March 2018, Uber announced it was using its automated trucks to deliver freight in Arizona, while also leveraging the UberFreight app to find and dispatch loads.
Embark Semi	In February 2018, Embark Trucks announced it had completed the first cross-country trip of an automated semi, driving 2,400 miles from Los Angeles, California to Jacksonville, Florida on Interstate 10. This followed a November 2017 announcement that it had partnered with Electrolux and Ryder to test its automated truck by moving Frigidaire refrigerators from El Paso, Texas to Palm Springs, California.
Tesla Semi	In November 2017 Tesla, Incorporated, owned by Elon Musk, revealed a prototype of the Tesla Semi and announced that it would go into production. This long-haul, electric semi-truck can drive itself and move in "platoons" that automatically follow a lead vehicle. It was disclosed in August 2017 that it sought permission to test the vehicles in Nevada.
Starsky Robotics	In 2017, Starsky Robotics unveiled its technology that allows to make trucks autonomous. Unlike its bigger competitors in this industry that aims to tackle Level 4 and 5 Autonomy, Starsky Robotics is aiming at producing Level 3 Autonomy trucks, in which the human drivers should be prepared to respond to a "request to intervene" in case anything goes wrong.
Pronto AI	In December 2018, Anthony Levandowski unveiled his new autonomous driving company, Pronto, which is building L2 ADAS technology for the commercial trucking industry. The company is based in San Francisco, California.

=== Motorcycles ===
Several self-balancing autonomous motorcycles were demonstrated in 2017 and 2018 from BMW, Honda and Yamaha.

Company/Location	Details
Honda motorcycle	Inspired by the Uni-cub, Honda implemented a self-balancing technology into their motorcycles. Due to the weight of motorcycles, it is often a challenge for motorcycle owners to keep balance of their vehicles at low speeds or at a stop. Honda's motorcycle concept has a self-balancing feature that will keep the vehicle upright. It automatically lowers the center of balance by extending the wheelbase. It then takes control of the steering to keep the vehicle balanced. This allows users to navigate the vehicle more easily when walking or driving in stop and go traffic. However, this system is not for high speed driving.
BMWs Motorrad Vision concept motorcycle	BMW Motorrad developed the ConnectRide self driving motorcycle in order to push the boundaries of motorcycle safety. The autonomous features of the motorcycle include emergency braking, negotiating intersections, assisting during tight turns, and front impact avoidance. These are features similar to current technologies that are being developed and implemented in autonomous cars. This motorcycle can also fully drive on its own at normal driving speed, making turns and returning to a designated location. It lacks the self standing feature that Honda has implemented.
Yamaha's riderless motorcycle	"Motoroid" can hold its balance, autonomously driving, recognizing riders and go to a designated location with a hand gesture. Yamaha used the "Human beings react a hell of a lot quicker" research philosophy into the motoroid. The idea is that the autonomous vehicle is not attempting to replace human beings, but to augment the abilities of the human with advanced technology. They have tactile feedback such as a gentle squeeze to a rider's lower back as a reassuring caress at dangerous speeds, as if the vehicle was responding and communicating with the rider. Their goal is to "meld" the machine and human together to form one experience.
Harley-Davidson	While their motorcycles are popular, one of the largest problems of owning a Harley-Davidson is the reliability of the vehicle. It is difficult to manage the weight of the vehicle at low speeds and picking it up from the ground can be a difficult process even with correct techniques. In order to attract more customers, they filed a patent for having a gyroscope at the back of the vehicle that will keep the balance of the motorcycle for the rider at low speeds. After 3 miles per hour, the system disengages. However anything below that, the gyroscope can handle the balance of the vehicle which means it can balance even at a stop. This system can be removed if the rider feels ready without it (meaning it is modular).

=== Trains ===
The concept for autonomous vehicles has also been applied for commercial uses, like for autonomous trains. The world's first driverless urban transit system is the Port Island Line in Kobe, Japan, opened in 1981. The first self-driving train in the UK was launched in London on the Thameslink route.

An example of an automated train network is the Docklands Light Railway in London.

Also see List of automated train systems.

=== Trams ===
In 2018 the first autonomous trams in Potsdam were trialed.

=== Automated guided vehicle ===
An automated guided vehicle or automatic guided vehicle (AGV) is a mobile robot that follows markers or wires in the floor, or uses vision, magnets, or lasers for navigation. They are most often used in industrial applications to move materials around a manufacturing facility or warehouse. Application of the automatic guided vehicle had broadened during the late 20th century.

== Aircraft ==
Aircraft have received much attention for automation, especially for navigation. A system capable of autonomously navigating a vehicle (especially aircraft) is known as autopilot.

=== Delivery drones ===
Various industries such as packages and food have experimented with delivery drones. Traditional and new transportation companies are competing in the market. For example, UPS Flight Forward, Alphabet Wing, and Amazon Prime Air are all developing delivery drones. Zipline, an American medical drone delivery company, has the largest active drone delivery operations in the world, and its drones are capable of Level 4 autonomy.

However, even if technology seems to allow for those solutions to function correctly as various tests of various companies show, the main throwback to the market launch and use of such drones is inevitably the legislation in place and regulatory agencies have to decide on the framework they wish to take to draft regulation. This process is in different phases across the world as each country will tackle the topic independently. For example, Iceland's government and departments of transport, aviation, police have already started issuing licenses for drone operations. It has a permissive approach and together with Costa Rica, Italy, the UAE, Sweden and Norway, has a fairly unrestricted legislation on commercial drone use. Those countries are characterized by a body of regulation that may give operational guidelines or require licensing, registration and insurance.

On the other side, other countries have decided to ban, either directly (outright ban) or indirectly (effective ban), the use of commercial drones. The RAND Corporation thus notes the difference between countries forbidding drones and those that have a formal process for commercial drone licensing, but requirements are either impossible to meet or licenses do not appear to have been approved. In the US, United Parcel Service is the only delivery service with the Part 135 Standard certification that is required to use drones to deliver to real customers.

However, most countries seem to be struggling on the integration of drones for commercial uses into their aviation regulatory frameworks. Thus, constraints are placed on the use of those drones such as that they must be operating within the visual line of sight (VLOS) of the pilot and thus limiting their potential range. This would be the case of the Netherlands and Belgium. Most countries let pilots operate outside the VLOS but is subject to restrictions and pilot ratings, which would be the case of the US.

The general trend is that legislation is moving fast and laws are constantly being reevaluated. Countries are moving towards a more permissive approach but the industry still lacks infrastructures to ensure the success of such a transition. To provide safety and efficiency, specialized training courses, pilot exams (type of UAV and flying conditions) as well as liability management measures regarding insurances may need to be developed.

There is a sense of urgency related to this innovation as competition is high and companies lobby to integrate them rapidly in their products and services offerings. Since June 2017, the US Senate legislation reauthorized the Federal Aviation Administration and the Department of Transportation to create a carrier certificate allowing for package deliveries by drones.

== Watercraft ==
Autonomous boats can provide security, perform research, or conduct hazardous or repetitive tasks (such as guiding a large ship into a harbor or transporting cargo).

=== DARPA ===
Sea Hunter is an autonomous unmanned surface vehicle (USV) launched in 2016 as part of the DARPA Anti-Submarine Warfare Continuous Trail Unmanned Vessel (ACTUV) program.

== Submersibles ==
Underwater vehicles have been a focus for automation for tasks such as pipeline inspection and underwater mapping.

== Assistance robots ==
=== Spot ===
This four-legged robot was created to be able to navigate through many different terrain outdoors and indoors. It can walk on its own without colliding into anything. It uses many different sensors, including 360-degree vision cameras and gyroscopes. It is able to keep its balance even when pushed over. This vehicle, while it is not intended to be ridden, can carry heavy loads for construction workers or military personnel through rough terrain.

== Regulation ==
The British Highway Code states that:

By self-driving vehicles, we mean those listed as automated vehicles by the Secretary of State for Transport under the Automated and Electric Vehicles Act 2018.

— The Highway Code – 27/07/2022, p. 4

The UK considers the way to update its British Highway Code for automated code:

Automated vehicles can perform all the tasks involved in driving, in at least some situations. They differ from vehicles fitted with assisted driving features (like cruise control and lane-keeping assistance), which carry out some tasks, but where the driver is still responsible for driving. If you are driving a vehicle with assisted driving features, you MUST stay in control of the vehicle.

— proposed changes to The Highway Code

If the vehicle is designed to require you to resume driving after being prompted to, while the vehicle is driving itself, you MUST remain in a position to be able to take control. For example, you should not move out of the driving seat. You should not be so distracted that you cannot take back control when prompted by the vehicle.

— proposed changes to The Highway Code

== Concerns ==
=== Lack of control ===
Through the autonomy level, it is shown that the higher the level of autonomy, the less control humans have on their vehicles (highest level of autonomy needing zero human interventions). One concerns regarding the development of vehicular automation is related to the end-users' trust in the technology that controls automated vehicles. According to a nationally conducted survey made by Kelley Blue Book (KBB) in 2016, it was shown that the majority of people would choose to have a certain level of control behind their own vehicle rather than having the vehicle operate in Level 5 autonomy, or in other words, complete autonomy. According to half of the respondents, the idea of safety in an autonomous vehicle diminishes as the level of autonomy increases. This distrust of autonomous driving systems proved to be unchanged throughout the years when a nationwide survey conducted by AAA Foundation for Traffic and Safety (AAAFTS) in 2019 showed the same outcome as the survey KBB did in 2016. AAAFTS survey showed that even though people have a certain level of trust in automated vehicles, most people also have doubts and distrust towards the technology used in autonomous vehicles, with most distrust in Level 5 autonomous vehicles. It is shown by AAAFTS' survey that people's trust in autonomous driving systems increased when their level of understanding increased.

Researchers have examined how in-vehicle interaction design can increase the acceptance of automated vehicles. One proposed approach is cooperative guidance and control, in which, rather than a binary choice between manual and automated driving, the driver and the automation share the driving task. In driving simulator studies, participants generally rated interfaces positively that let them select or initiate maneuvers or adjust parameters such as target speed.

=== Malfunctions ===
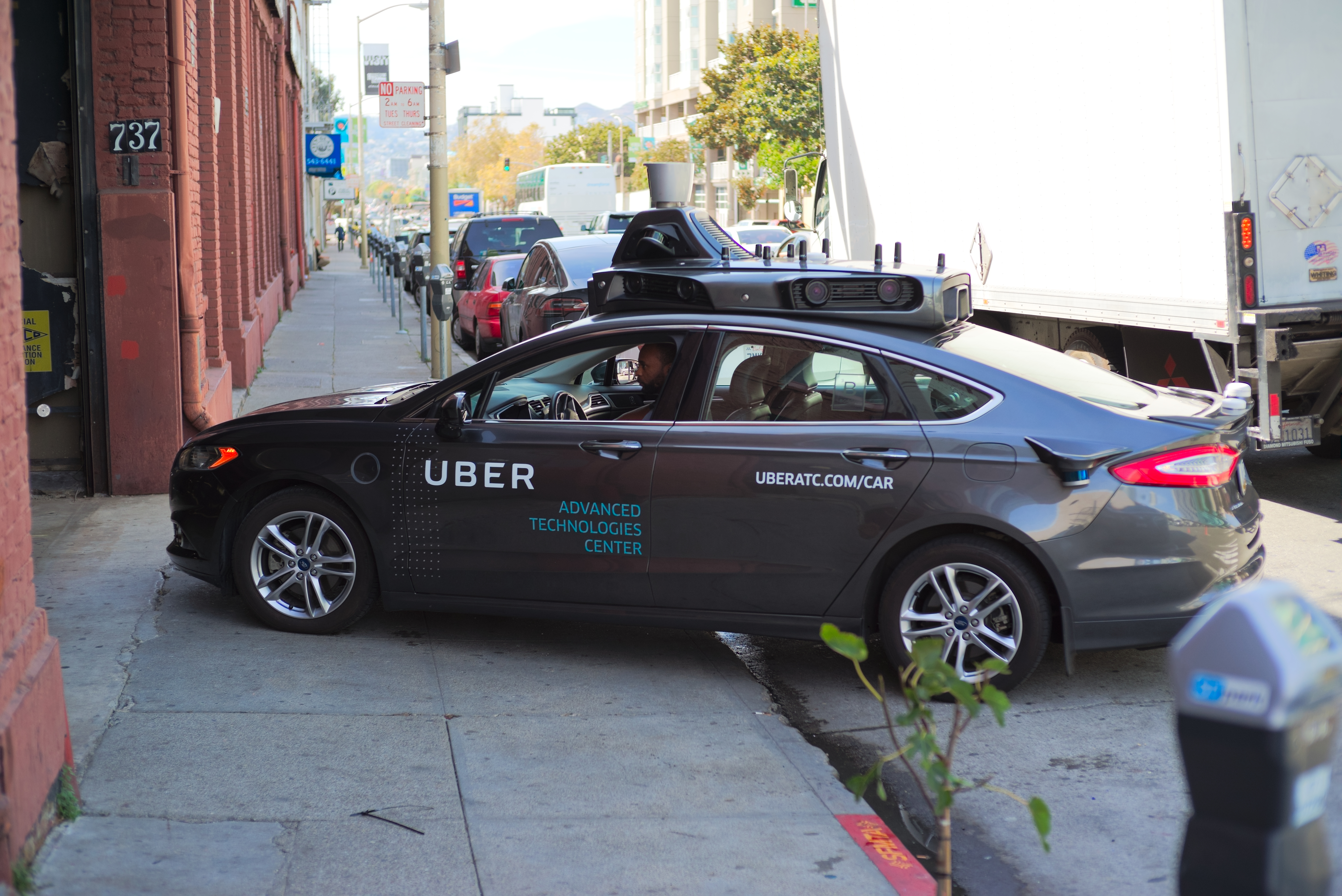
A prototype of an autonomous Uber car being tested in San Francisco, California

The possibility of autonomous vehicle's technology to experience malfunctions is also one of the causes of user's distrust in autonomous driving systems. It is the concern that most respondents voted for in the AAAFTS survey. Even though autonomous vehicles are made to improve traffic safety by minimizing crashes and their severity, they still caused fatalities. At least 113 autonomous vehicle related accidents have occurred until 2018. In 2015, Google declared that their automated vehicles experienced at least 272 failures, and drivers had to intervene around 13 times to prevent fatalities. Furthermore, other automated vehicles' manufacturers also reported automated vehicles' failures, including the Uber car incident. A self-driving Uber car accident in 2018 is an example of autonomous vehicle accidents that are also listed among self-driving car fatalities. A report made by the National Transportation Safety Board (NTSB) showed that the self-driving Uber car was unable to identify the victim in a sufficient amount of time for the vehicle to slow down and avoid crashing into the victim.

=== Ethical ===
Another concern related to vehicle automation is its ethical issues. In reality, autonomous vehicles can encounter inevitable traffic accidents. In such situations, many risks and calculations need to be made in order to minimize the amount of damage the accident could cause. When a human driver encounters an inevitable accident, the driver will take a spontaneous action based on ethical and moral logic. However, when a driver has no control over the vehicle (Level 5 autonomy), the system of an autonomous vehicle needs to make that quick decision. Unlike humans, autonomous vehicles can only make decisions based on what it is programmed to do. However, the situation and circumstances of accidents differ from one another, and any one decision might not be the best decision for certain accidents. Based on two research studies in 2019, the implementation of fully automated vehicles in traffic where semi-automated and non-automated vehicles are still present might lead to complications. Some flaws that still need consideration include the structure of liability, distribution of responsibilities, efficiency in decision making, and the performance of autonomous vehicles with its diverse surroundings. Still, researchers Steven Umbrello and Roman V. Yampolskiy propose that the value sensitive design approach is one method that can be used to design autonomous vehicles to avoid some of these ethical issues and design for human values.

== See also ==
- Autonomous bicycle
- Self-driving car
- Self-driving truck
- Dashcam
- Intelligent speed adaptation
- Intelligent Transportation System
- Robotaxi
- Transit media
- Uncrewed vehicle
- Software Defined Vehicle (SDV)

== Works cited ==
- "Uber Self-Driving Cars Hit The Streets Of Pittsburgh". www.cbsnews.com. 14 September 2016.
- Badue, Claudine; Guidolini, Rânik; Carneiro, Raphael Vivacqua; Azevedo, Pedro; Cardoso, Vinicius B.; Forechi, Avelino; Jesus, Luan; Berriel, Rodrigo; Paixão, Thiago M.; Mutz, Filipe; de Paula Veronese, Lucas; Oliveira-Santos, Thiago; De Souza, Alberto F. (1 March 2021). "Self-driving cars: A survey". Expert Systems with Applications. 165 113816. Elsevier. arXiv:1901.04407. doi:10.1016/j.eswa.2020.113816.
- Azam, Shoaib; Munir, Farzeen; Sheri, Ahmad Muqeem; Kim, Joonmo; Jeon, Moongu (22 October 2020). "System, Design and Experimental Validation of Autonomous Vehicle in an Unconstrained Environment". Sensors. 20 (21): 5999. Bibcode:2020Senso..20.5999A. doi:10.3390/s20215999. PMC 7660187. PMID 33105897.
- Serban, Alex; Poll, Erik; Visser, Joost (2020). "A Standard Driven Software Architecture for Fully Autonomous Vehicles". Journal of Automotive Software Engineering. 1 (1). Atlantis Press: 20. doi:10.2991/jase.d.200212.001.
