= Platoon (automobile) =

Group of vehicles travelling separately but following another

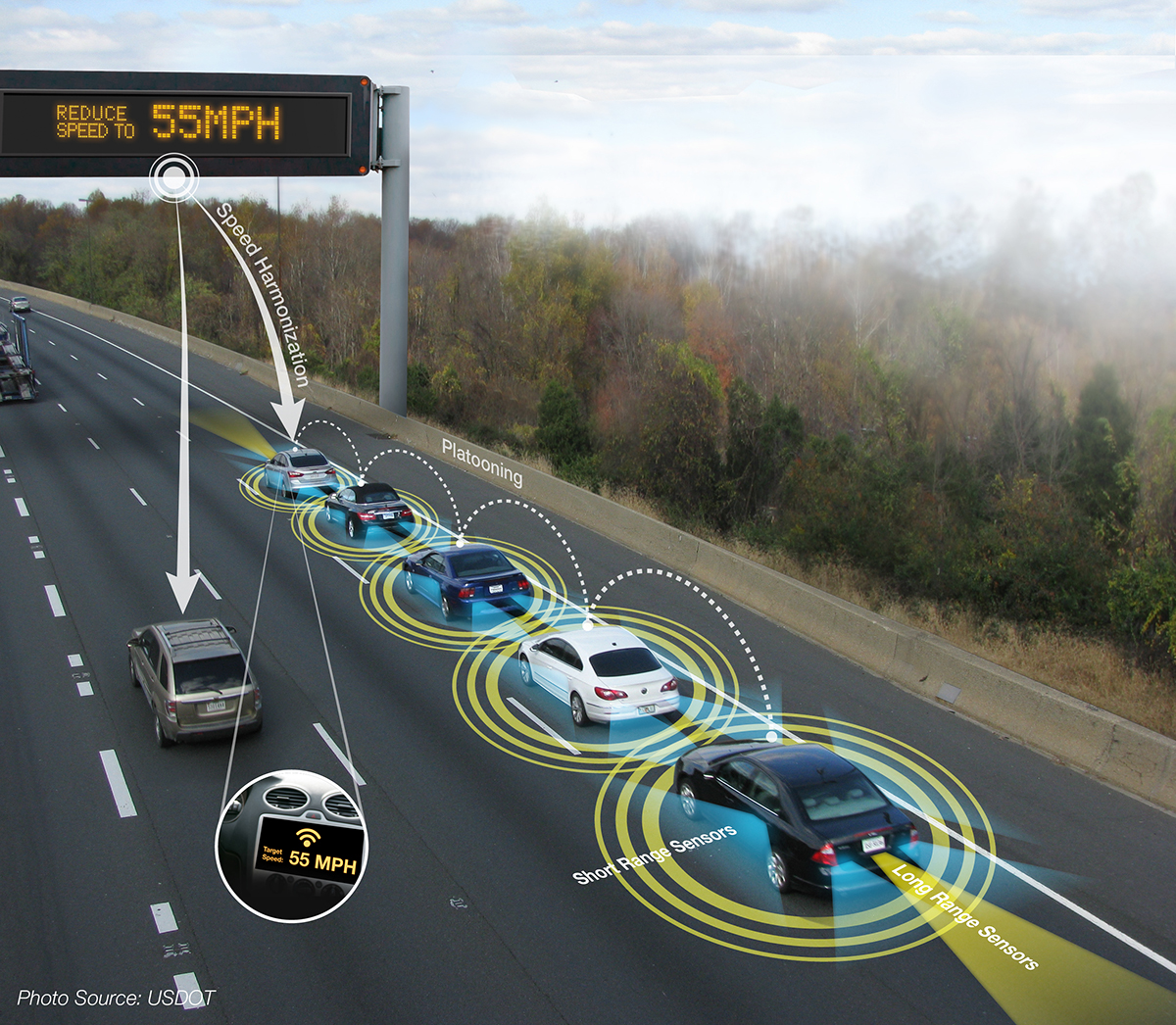
Illustration of cooperative adaptive cruise control in a series of vehicles

In transportation, platooning or flocking is a method for driving a group of vehicles together. It is meant to increase the capacity of roads via an automated highway system.

Platoons decrease the distances between cars or trucks using electronic, and possibly mechanical, coupling. This capability would allow many cars or trucks to accelerate or brake simultaneously. This system also allows for a closer headway between vehicles by eliminating reacting distance needed for human reaction.

Platoon capability might require buying new vehicles, or it may be something that can be retrofitted. Drivers would probably need a special license endorsement on account of the new skills required and the added responsibility when driving in the lead.

Smart cars with artificial intelligence could automatically join and leave platoons. The automated highway system is a proposal for one such system, where cars organise themselves into platoons of 8 to 25.

== Potential benefits ==
- Greater fuel economy due to reduced air resistance and by reducing the need for acceleration, deceleration, and stopping to maintain traffic flow.
- Reduced congestion.
- Shorter commutes during peak periods.
- On longer highway trips, vehicles could be mostly unattended whilst in following mode.
- Vehicle to vehicle charging

== Potential disadvantages ==
- Some systems have failed in traffic, as they have been hacked by remote computers, creating a hazardous situation.
- Drivers would be less in control of their own driving, being at the hands of computer software or the lead driver.
- Drivers may be less attentive than usual, and they may not be able to react as quickly to adverse situations if the software or hardware were to fail.
- The close spacing would not give drivers enough time to react to hazards if the software or hardware were to fail.
- Platooning is only possible when enough vehicles with the same software are driving together, and could be difficult in real-life situations with a mixture of vehicle types.
- Interactions between platooning and non-platooning vehicles in real-life situations may be difficult, due to differing requirements for headway and reaction time, different driving styles, and the possibility of a platoon blocking lane changes and merging traffic.
- In the event of a traffic collision with the lead vehicle, the entire platoon may be caught in a multiple-vehicle collision due to the reduced vehicle spacing.
- The close spacing of platooning vehicles may serve to further normalize tailgating among drivers of non-platooning vehicles, increasing dangerous driving behavior.

== Automated highway system ==
An automated highway system (AHS), or smart road, is a proposed intelligent transportation system technology designed to provide for driverless cars on specific right-of ways. It is most often recommended as a means of traffic congestion relief, on the grounds that it would drastically reduce following distances and headway, thus allowing a given stretch of road to carry more cars.

=== Principle ===
In one scheme, the roadway has magnetized stainless-steel spikes driven one meter apart in its center. The car senses the spikes to measure its speed and locate the center of the lane. Furthermore, the spikes can have either magnetic north or magnetic south facing up. The roadway thus provides small amounts of digital data describing interchanges and recommended speeds.

The cars have power steering and automatic speed controls, which are controlled by a computer.

The cars organize themselves into platoons of 8 to 25 cars. The cars within a platoon drive themselves a meter apart, so that air resistance is minimized. The distance between platoons is the conventional braking distance. If anything goes wrong, the maximum number of harmed cars should be one platoon.

An overview of platooning systems is given in Bergenhem et al.

Platooning of trucks has been proposed as a concept to reduce the energy consumption of semi-trucks and improve the feasibility of electric semi-trucks.

=== Early development ===
The origin of research on AHS was done by a team from Ohio State University led by Robert E. Fenton, based on funding from the U.S. Federal Highway Administration. Their first automated vehicle was built in 1962, and is believed to be the first land vehicle to contain a computer. Steering, braking and speed were controlled through the onboard electronics, which filled the trunk, back seat and most of the front of the passenger side of the car. Research continued at OSU until federal funding was cut in the early 1980s.

=== Deployments ===
==== United States ====
The USDOT-sponsored National Automated Highway System Consortium (NAHSC) project, a prototype automated highway system, was tested in San Diego County, California in 1997 along Interstate 15. However, despite the technical success of the program, investment has moved more toward autonomous intelligent vehicles rather than building specialized infrastructure. The AHS system places sensory technology in cars that can read passive road markings, and use radar and inter-car communications to make the cars organize themselves without the intervention of drivers. Such an autonomous cruise control system is being developed by Mercedes-Benz, BMW, Volkswagen and Toyota.

The Federal Highway Administration in 2013 funded two research projects in heavy truck platooning (without steering automation). One is led by Auburn University with Peterbilt, American Trucking Associations, Meritor Wabco, and Peloton Technology and the other is led by California Department of Transportation, with UC Berkeley and Volvo Trucks.

==== SARTRE ====
The SARTRE Project (Safe Road Trains for the Environment), is a European Commission funded project investigating implementation of platooning on unmodified European motorways. The project begun in September 2009, and vehicle platooning, as envisaged by the SARTRE project, is a convoy of vehicles in which a professional driver in a lead vehicle heads a line of closely following vehicles. Each following vehicle autonomously measures the distance, speed and direction and adjusts to the vehicle in front. Once in the platoon, drivers can do other things while the platoon proceeds towards its long-haul destination. All vehicles are detached and can leave the procession at any time.

In January 2011, SARTRE made the first successful demonstration of its platooning technology at the Volvo Proving Ground near Gothenburg, Sweden, in which a lead truck was followed by a car. In January 2012, SARTRE made a second demonstration in Barcelona, Spain, in which a lead truck was followed by three cars driven entirely autonomously at speeds of up to 90 km/h (56 mph) with a gap between of at most 6 m (20 ft). The companies that participated in SARTRE were Volvo Trucks and Volvo Car Corporation.

EU Truck Platooning Challenge

During its Presidency of the European Union in 2016, the Netherlands organised a European Truck Platooning Challenge. Six brands of automated trucks – DAF Trucks, Daimler Trucks, Iveco, MAN Truck & Bus, Scania AB and Volvo Trucks – ran on public roads from several European cities to the Netherlands.

=== Japan ===
In January 2018, trucks from different manufacturers were successfully driven by platooning for the first time on the Shin-Tomei Expressway in Japan.

In February, 2021, Ministry of Economy, Trade and Industry (METI) and Ministry of Land, Infrastructure, Transport and Tourism (MLIT) successfully achieved traveling of trucks on part of the Shin-Tomei Expressway in a platoon in which no drivers were present in either the second or the following trucks, with staff in only the passenger seat for security purposes.

=== South Korea ===
In November 2019, Hyundai Motor Group successfully conducted its first platooning of trucks on a highway for the first time in Korea. Demonstrations of platooning, cut-in/cut-out of other vehicles, simultaneous emergency braking, and V2V communication technology were conducted.

== Innovation ==
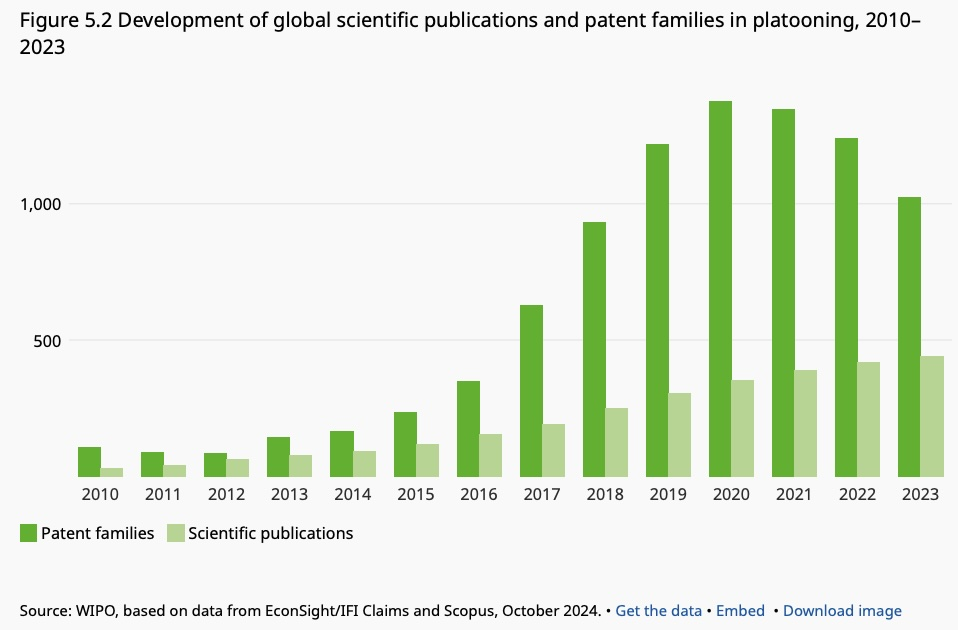
Research and patenting activities relating to platooning have grown rapidly since 2014, but patent publications have declined since 2020

Scientific research on platooning has gained momentum over the past decade, especially from 2018 onward. Patent activities related to platooning have been increasing too. Major automotive and technology companies, such as Toyota, Volvo, Baidu, or Alphabet, are actively filing patents for various aspects of platooning, including V2V communication protocols, control systems and safety mechanisms. Between 2014 and 2023, the number of published patent families per year increased from less than 200 to over 1,000. However, patent families have declined over recent years, after having peaked at almost 1,400 in 2020.

== See also ==
- Train
- Autonomous car
- Drafting (aerodynamics)
- Green wave
- Peloton
- Road train
- Safe Road Trains for the Environment
- Smart highway
- Traffic assignment
- Vehicle Infrastructure Integration
- Virginia Smart Road
- Wardrop equilibrium

== Sources ==
This article incorporates text from a free content work. Licensed under CC-BY-4.0. Text taken from Platoon (automobile), WIPO.
