= Safe Road Trains for the Environment =

Safe Road Trains for the Environment (SARTRE) is a European Commission-funded project to investigate and trial technologies and strategies for the safe platooning of road vehicles, a transportation concept in which several vehicles are electronically linked together in a "road train", with only the lead driver in active control. The three-year project was launched in 2009. The research and development was carried out by several European auto manufactures with Volvo at the lead. A first practical test successfully took place in December 2010. In September Volvo announced that the SARTRE research project had come to a close, and that the company was ready to look into putting its finished product on the road.

== Project aims ==
The aim of the project is to develop prototype systems to aid the development of platooning for eventual use on unmodified public motorways, interacting with non-platooned traffic. The project was formally launched in September 2009, with an intended duration of three years. The EU hopes the use of platooning on European roads would cut fuel consumption, journey times, and congestion.

== Proposed system ==
The SARTRE platooning system envisages a platoon of up to eight vehicles linked electronically, with the lead vehicle controlled by a professional driver, controlling in turn those following, as slave vehicles. Aimed at commuters in cars, but also possibly commercial vehicles and buses, drivers would be able to join and leave the platoon at will. To keep costs down, the technology for the system is to be achieved through off the shelf components, and specifically without requiring costly changes to highway infrastructure.

== Funding and participants ==
The SARTRE project is run as a consortium, funded by the European Commission under their Seventh Framework Programme. The consortium is led by the British company Ricardo UK. Other participating organisations are:

- Applus IDIADA (Spain)
- Institut für Kraftfahrwesen Aachen (IKA) (Germany)
- Robotiker-Tecnalia (Spain)
- SP Technical Research Institute of Sweden
- Volvo Car Corporation (Sweden)
- Volvo Technology (Sweden)

== Trials ==
Test track trials of SARTRE platooning took place at the Volvo Proving Ground near Gothenburg, Sweden and in a public road in Spain. In January 2011 the first successful trial took place at Volvo's test track in Sweden, in which a single car followed behind a rigid truck. With control being taken by the truck, the driver of the slaved car was able to take his hands off the wheel, read a newspaper, and sip coffee.

In January 2012 SARTRE carried out a second demonstration in a public road in Barcelona, Spain, this time with a multiple vehicle platoon, a lead truck followed by three cars driven entirely autonomously at speeds of up to 90 km/h (56 mph) with a gap between the vehicles of no more than 6 m (20 ft). Volvo Car Corporation was the only participating car manufacturer.

== See also ==
- Autonomous car
- Platoon (automobile)
- Roads in Europe

== Publications ==
- Carl Bergenhem (25 October 2010). Challenges of Platooning on Public Motorways (PDF). 17th World Congress on Intelligent Transport Systems. SARTRE Project. Archived from the original (pdf) on 27 June 2011.
- Tom Robinson (25 October 2010). Operating Platoons on Public Motorways: An Introduction To The SARTRE Platooning Programme (PDF). 17th World Congress on Intelligent Transport Systems. SARTRE Project. Archived from the original (pdf) on 27 June 2011.
- Maider Larburu (25 October 2010). SAFE ROAD TRAINS FOR ENVIRONMENT: Human factors’ aspects in dual mode transport systems (PDF). 17th World Congress on Intelligent Transport Systems. SARTRE Project. Archived from the original (pdf) on 20 July 2011.
- Arturo Dávila (21 September 2010). SARTRE: Safe Road Trains for the Environment (PDF). Conference on Personal Rapid Transit PRT@LHR 2010. SARTRE Project. Archived from the original (pdf) on 20 July 2011.
