= Peloton Technology =

American vehicle technology company

- Type: Private company
- Industry: Connected vehicle technology
- Founded: 2011
- Founders: Josh Switkes, Dave Lyons, Steve Boyd
- Headquarters: Mountain View, California, U.S.
- Website: peloton-tech.com

Peloton Technology was an American automated and connected vehicle technology company established in 2011 and headquartered in Mountain View, California. It primarily developed a vehicle "platooning" system to enable pairs of trucks to operate at close following distances with a stated goal of improving safety and fuel efficiency. Peloton Technology was the first company to test a non-research commercial truck platooning system on public roads in the United States. In 2016 it publicly stated it would be the first company to offer a commercial platooning system for use by truck fleets in 2017. By mid-2018 that deadline had slipped to "by the end of 2018."

In Summer of 2021, Peloton ceased operations and began liquidation proceedings.

== Platooning system ==
Peloton Technology uses 5.9 GHz DSRC to establish Vehicle-to-Vehicle (V2V) communications between pairs of trucks. Combined with commercially available radar-based forward collision avoidance systems on each truck, this allows two trucks to operate with a shorter minimum safe following distance. The result is that trucks are able to platoon, improving aerodynamics to reduce fuel consumption. This implementation of these technologies together for the purpose of maintaining a constant gap between vehicles is sometimes referred to as Cooperative Adaptive Cruise Control.

Peloton's system includes connection of each individual truck to a cloud-based monitoring and management system, which they refer to as the Network Operations Center (NOC). The NOC is designed to monitor individual truck safety and geofence the use of the platooning system by approving the linking of pairs of trucks in specific order only on suitable roads under appropriate weather, vehicle and traffic conditions.

Peloton's version of truck platooning operates at SAE Automation Level 1, where drivers in both vehicles continue to steer while the following driver's acceleration and braking is automated to immediately mimic the actions of the leading truck.

== Testing ==
Peloton's platooning system has reportedly been tested over approximately 15,000 miles in several states, including Nevada, Texas, Utah, Michigan, and California. Unique from government and university-funded research projects, Peloton's system is the only commercial platooning system to have been tested on public roads with the intention of deploying to fleets. CEO Josh Switkes has stated that the platooning system will be commercially available in 2017.

A 2013 test of Peloton's system held on I-80 in Utah and validated by the North American Council for Freight Efficiency following the industry standard SAE J1321 Type II fuel consumption test procedure found fuel savings of 10% in the following truck and 4.5% in the lead truck at 64 miles per hour (103 km/h) with a 36-foot (11 m) following distance.

In 2014, the U.S. National Renewable Energy Laboratory conducted testing of Peloton's platooning system following the SAE J1321 Type II fuel consumption test procedure at the Continental Tire Uvalde Proving Grounds in Uvalde, Texas, using various truck weights and following distances. The tests found combined savings of 6.4% at 55 miles per hour (89 km/h) with a 30-foot (9.1 m) gap using 65,000 lb GVW tractor trailers. Combined savings of better than 5% were found to persist at a gap of 75 feet (23 m).

== Funding ==
In April 2015, Peloton closed a $16 million Series A round led by Denso International America and Intel Capital, which also included Magna International, Castrol innoVentures, Volvo Group Venture Capital, UPS Strategic Enterprise Fund, Sand Hill Angels, Band of Angels, and Birchmere Ventures. Peloton has since announced additional funding by Nokia Growth Partners and Lockheed Martin.

== Board of directors ==
Peloton's board of directors included former Corporate Vice President of Research & Development for General Motors Larry Burns; former U.S. Secretary of Transportation Rodney E. Slater; Former Trimble CTO Ralph Eschenbach of Sand Hill Angels; Mark Lydon of Intel Capital, and Ken Arnold of Band of Angels.

== Government research and technology deployment projects ==
Peloton was engaged in several state and federally funded research projects related to truck platooning. The company is a partner in a Federal Highway Administration-funded "Partial Automation for Truck Platooning" project led by Auburn University that includes the American Transportation Research Institute, Meritor WABCO, and Peterbilt Trucks. Peloton also contributes to a second FHWA-funded platooning research project led by UC Berkeley PATH and including Volvo Trucks. Peloton was a partner in the US Department of Transportation-funded Smart City Challenge project awarded to Columbus, Ohio, in July 2016. The California Energy Commission granted the San Diego Port Tenants Association a $5.9 million grant in July 2016 to fund 10 zero-emissions freight vehicles, which includes Peloton Technology as a technology subcontractor. Peloton was also involved with NEXTCAR (Next-Generation Energy Technologies for Connected and Automated On-Road Vehicles), a Department of Energy Advanced Research Projects Agency-Energy (ARPA-E)-sponsored project that aims to develop technologies that will use emerging connectivity infrastructure. A Purdue University-led team of NEXTCAR researchers are focusing on technologies that benefit line-haul Class 8 trucks with an emphasis on platooning vehicles.

== See also ==
- Drafting (aerodynamics)
- Platoon (automobile)
- Vehicular automation
- Dedicated short-range communications
- Vehicle-to-vehicle
- Cooperative Adaptive Cruise Control
- Connected car
- Advanced driver-assistance systems
