= Larry Burns (General Motors) =

American businessman, engineer, and consultant

Lawrence D. Burns is the former corporate vice president of Research and Development for General Motors. Burns oversaw GM's advanced technology, innovation programs, and corporate strategy. He was a member of GM's Automotive Strategy Board and Automotive Product Board. Within GM, he personally championed vehicle electrification, “connected” vehicles, fuel cells, bio-fuels, advanced batteries, autonomous driving, and a series of innovative concept vehicles. He has been a leading advocate for design and technology innovation focused on the total customer experience and the application of operations research before his retirement in 2009. He is the author of Autonomy: The Quest to Build the Driverless Car—And How It Will Reshape Our World and a co-author of Reinventing the Automobile: Personal Urban Mobility for the 21st Century.

Burns was invited to speak at the 2005 TED Conference.

In 2011, Burns was elected a member of the National Academy of Engineering for leadership and technical contributions to automotive technologies.

Burns advises organizations on the future of mobility, logistics, manufacturing, energy and innovation. His clients include Waymo (previously Google Self-Driving Cars), Peloton Technology and Kitson & Partners.
