= Cooperative Adaptive Cruise Control =

The Cooperative Adaptive Cruise Control (CACC) is an extension to the adaptive cruise control (ACC) concept using Vehicle-to-Everything (V2X) communication. CACC realises longitudinal automated vehicle control. In addition to the feedback loop used in the ACC, which uses Radar, Camera and/or LIDAR measurements to derive the range to the vehicle in front, the preceding vehicle's acceleration is used in a feed-forward loop. The preceding vehicle's acceleration is obtained from the Cooperative Awareness Messages (alternatively BSM in the US) it transmits using ETSI ITS-G5, DSRC / WAVE technology (both based on IEEE 802.11p) or LTE-V2X PC5 interface as part of the C-V2X technology (specified by 3GPP). Generally, these messages are transmitted several times per second by future vehicles equipped with ITS capabilities.

== Benefits over ACC ==
ACC systems, like human drivers, may not exhibit string stability. This means that oscillations which are introduced into a traffic flow – by braking and accelerating vehicles – may be amplified in the upstream direction. This leads to so-called phantom traffic jams (in the best case) or head-tail collisions (in the worst case). It has been shown that ACC systems designed to maintain a fixed following distance will not be string stable. ACC systems designed to maintain a fixed following time may or may not be string stable.

CACC addresses this problem, and in either case may improve stability, by reducing the delay of the response to the preceding vehicle. In human drivers this delay depends on reaction time and actions such as moving the foot from throttle to brake pedal. In ACC this delay is reduced, but there still is a large phase delay because of the estimation algorithm needed to translate the discrete range measurements (supplied by radar or lidar) to a metric of change in range over time (i.e. acceleration and deceleration of the lead vehicle). CACC utilizes vehicle-to-vehicle communications so that the vehicle has information not just on the vehicle immediately in front (through sensors), but also on a leading vehicle or vehicles further in front, through vehicle-to-vehicle communications of key parameters such as position, velocity, acceleration.

== Implementations ==
The Dutch Connect&Drive project implemented CACC in seven Toyota Prius vehicles in 2009–2010. This project used a communication stack based on the reference architecture of the Car-2-Car Communication Consortium, using IEEE 802.11a hardware at the physical layer.

The Grand Cooperative Driving Challenge (GCDC) in 2011 was an international challenge for teams from universities and industry to participate with a vehicle which could cooperatively drive several defined traffic scenarios. CACC was a large part of the challenge. The communication stack was based on CALM FAST, using (by that time commercially available) IEEE 802.11p hardware in the 5.9 GHz range. The criteria on CACC performance included low platoon length, fast traveling time, platoon merging behaviour, and damping behaviour in strong acceleration and deceleration situations.
