= GMC Terrain =

Compact crossover SUV

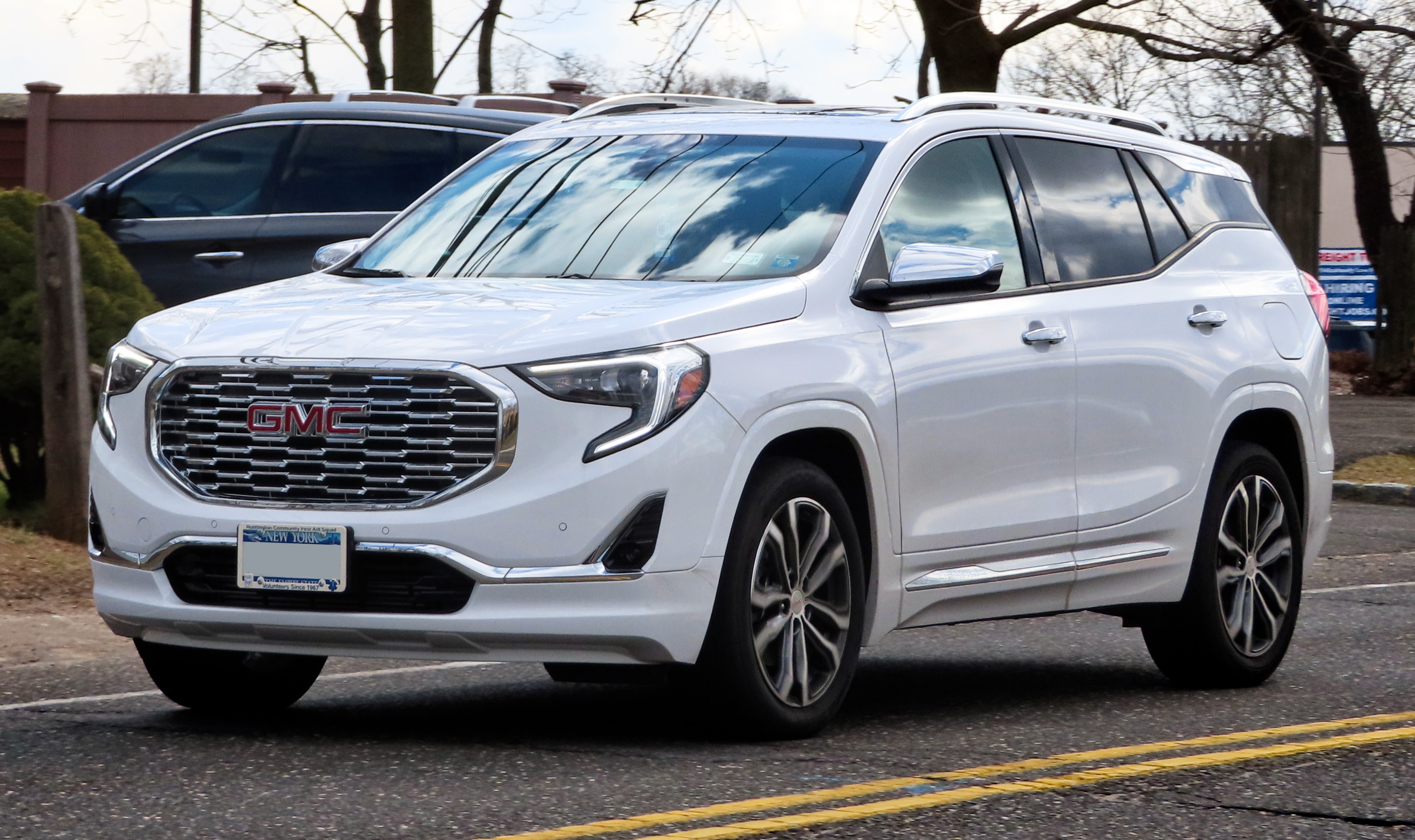

Overview
- Manufacturer: General Motors
- Production: August 2009 – present
- Model years: 2010–present

Body and chassis
- Class: Mid-size crossover SUV (2010–2017); Compact crossover SUV (2018–present)
- Body style: 5-door SUV
- Layout: Transverse front-engine, front-wheel drive / all-wheel drive

Chronology
- Predecessor: GMC Envoy; Pontiac Torrent; GMC Terrain (for variant of Opel Antara, Middle East); Isuzu Ascender 5-passenger

The GMC Terrain is a crossover SUV by American manufacturer General Motors under its GMC marque. Sharing its platform with the Chevrolet Equinox, the first-generation Terrain was built on GM's Theta platform, while subsequent generations are built on the Delta platform. The Terrain is the smallest GMC vehicle, slotted below the Acadia. It also indirectly replaced the Pontiac Torrent which was typically sold via the same dealers prior to General Motors dropping the Pontiac brand.

== First generation (2010) ==
First generation
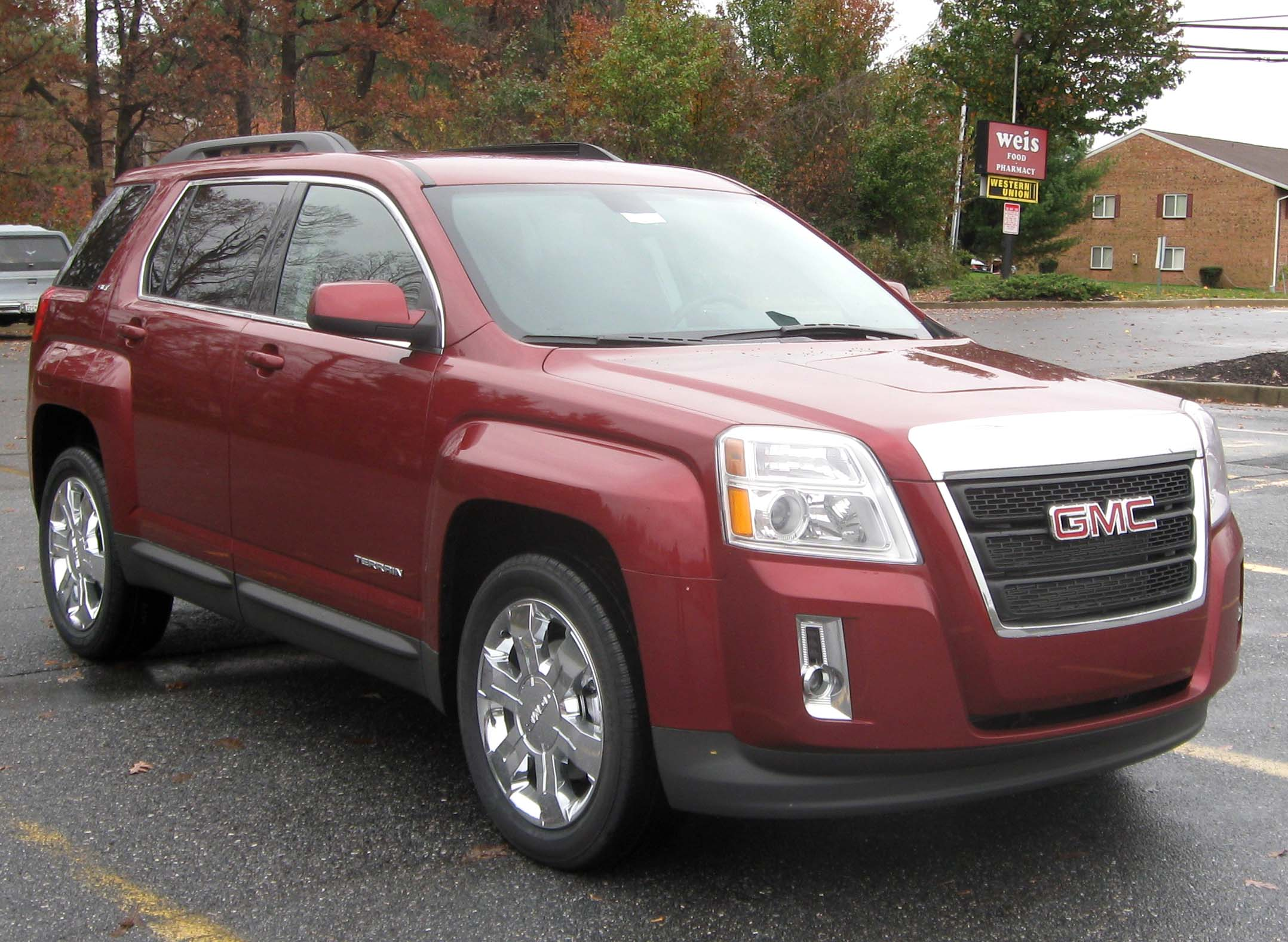

Overview
- Production: August 10, 2009 – 2017
- Model years: 2010–2017
- Assembly: Canada: Ingersoll, Ontario (CAMI Assembly)

Body and chassis
- Body style: 5-door SUV
- Platform: GM Theta platform/GMT177
- Related: Chevrolet Equinox; Cadillac SRX

Powertrain
- Engine: 2.4 L LAF or LEA I4; 3.0 L LF1 or LFW V6; 3.6 L LFX V6
- Transmission: 6-speed automatic I4 Models 6T45; V6 Models 6T70

Dimensions
- Wheelbase: 112.5 in (2,858 mm)
- Length: 2010–2012: 185.3 in (4,707 mm); 2013–2017: 187.8 in (4,770 mm)
- Width: 72.8 in (1,849 mm)
- Height: 66.3 in (1,684 mm)

The 2010 Terrain debuted in April 2009 at the New York International Auto Show, introduced as a replacement for the Pontiac Torrent, which ended production after GM shut down the Pontiac brand in 2010. Although the preceding Pontiac Torrent had the same Theta platform, the Torrent was a rebadged version of the original Chevrolet Equinox from 2005 to 2009, while GM decided to differ the look of the Chevrolet Equinox with its 2010 Terrain and still use the Theta platform. Early 2010 models had the GM Mark of Excellence logo applied on the sides of the vehicle.

The Terrain initially came in SLE and SLT trims. All models included a backup camera, AM/FM/CD/MP3 radio with USB port, laminated front door glass and tempered deep-tinted rear glass, Multi-Flex fore/aft adjustable rear seat, telescoping steering wheel, four-wheel independent suspension, and four-wheel vented disc hydraulic anti-lock brakes. For the 2013 model year, a Denali trim was added, featuring additional chrome trim (including unique exhaust tips), slightly improved interior quality, and firmer front struts. The Denali also offered cross-traffic detection, blind-spot warning, and a power passenger seat as options, but unlike many of its competitors, dual-zone climate control was not available. A low-end SL trim was added for 2015; derived from the SLE-1 trim, it was only available with front-wheel drive and the 2.4-liter Ecotec engine, and had very limited option availability.

=== 2016 refresh ===
For 2016, the GMC Terrain received a facelift as part of its first mid-cycle refresh along with the Equinox. The refreshed version debuted at the 2015 New York International Auto Show. The refresh consisted of new front and rear fascias, chrome exhaust tips (first used on the 2013 Denali) on all models, a power dome hood, LED daytime running lights, new wheels, a new gear selector, a second storage shelf under the dashboard (in the place of the discontinued CD player), as well as the deletion of the door lock buttons from the dashboard. The rear door child safety locks are now manual instead of electronically controlled.

For 2017, GMC introduced the Terrain Nightfall edition, replacing chrome with gloss-black finish on the grille surround, the front and rear fascia accents, the license-plate surround, mirror caps, and roof rack, as well as charcoal grille inserts and darkened headlights pulled from the Terrain Denali. The Terrain Nightfall came with revised rims with machined faces and black spokes. The Terrain Nightfall trim was available on the SLE-2 and SLT trim levels and was available only in Onyx Black, Summit White, Graphite Gray, and Crimson Red.

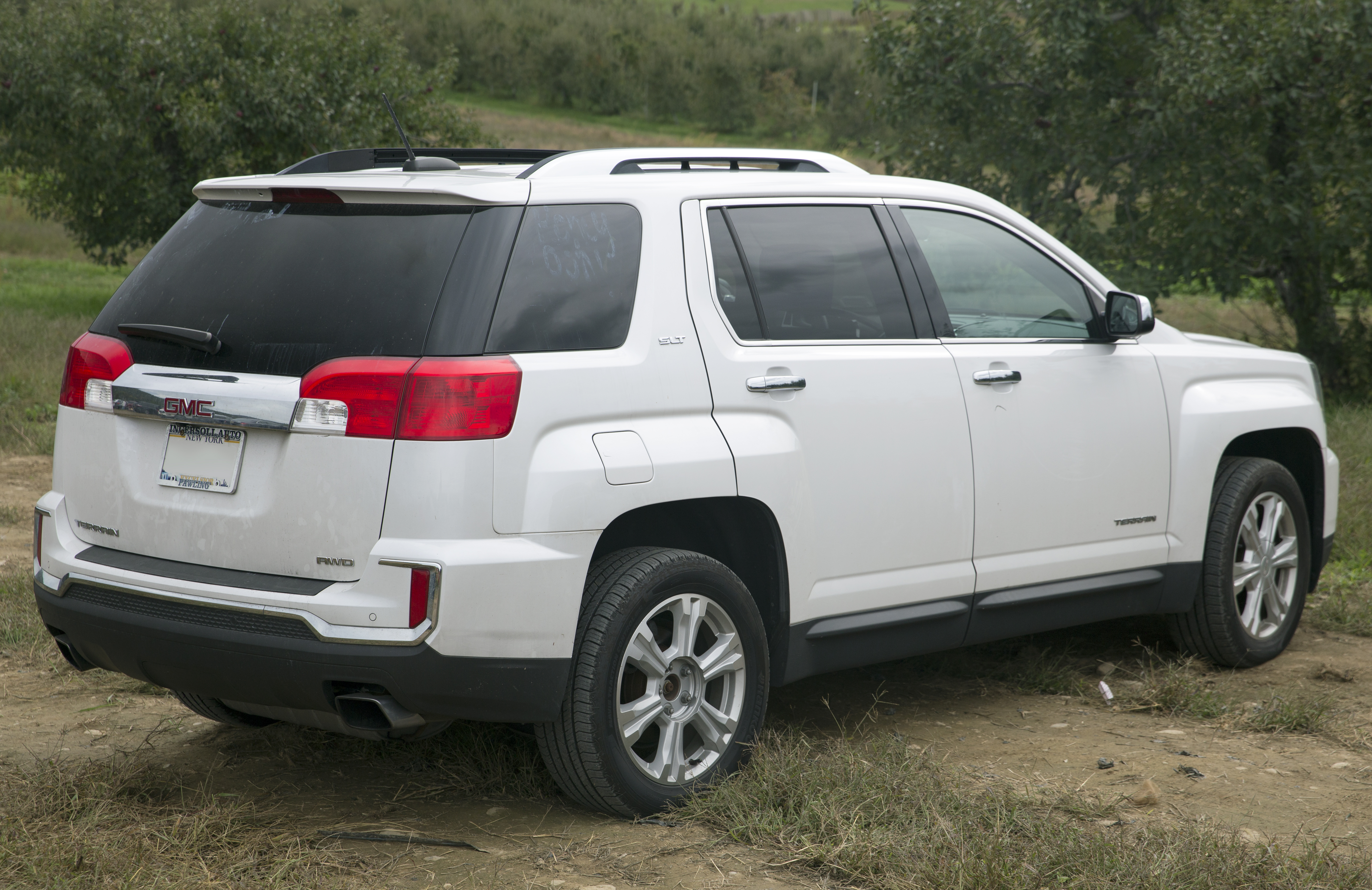
Rear view

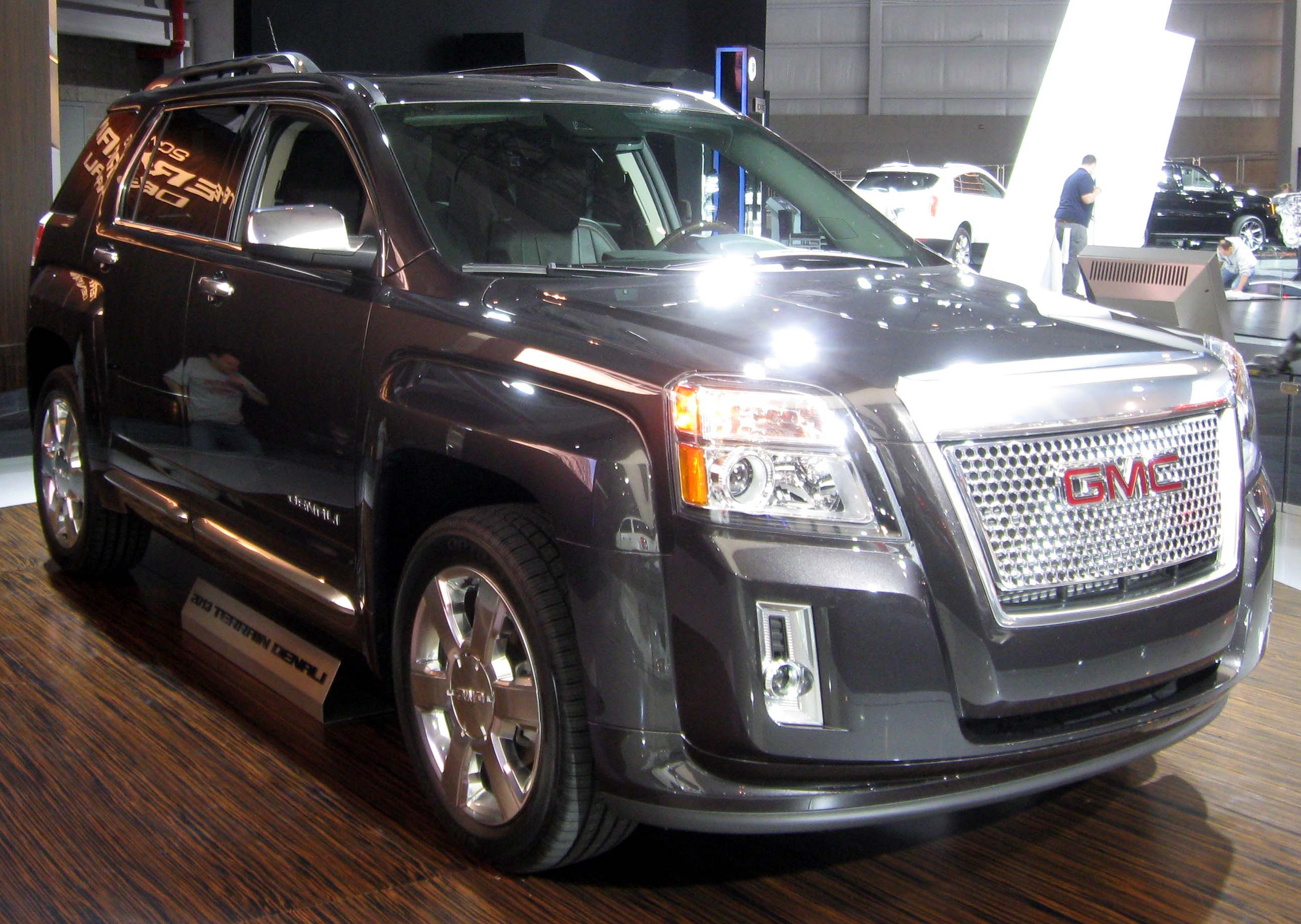
2013 GMC Terrain Denali

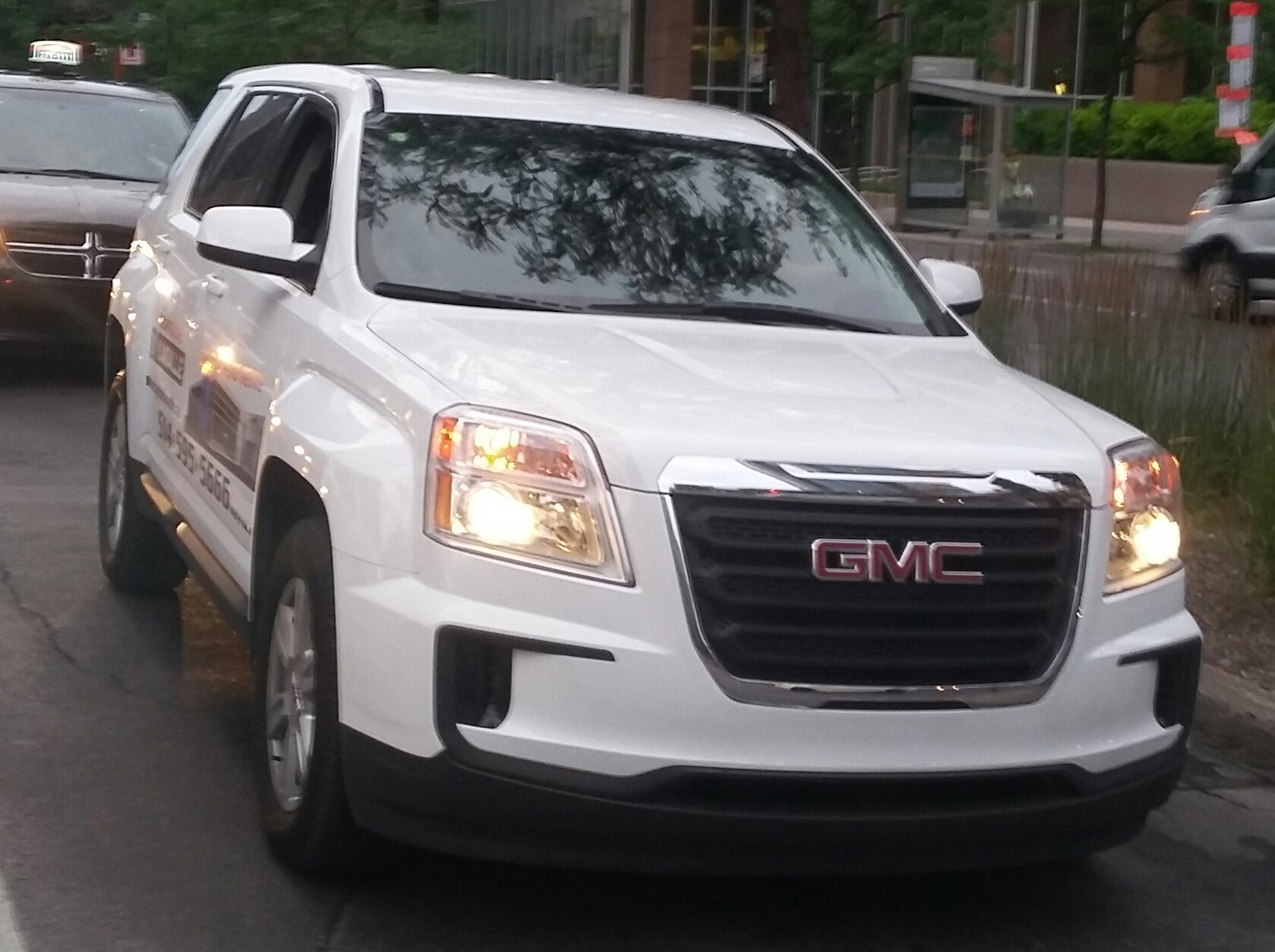
2016 GMC Terrain SLE

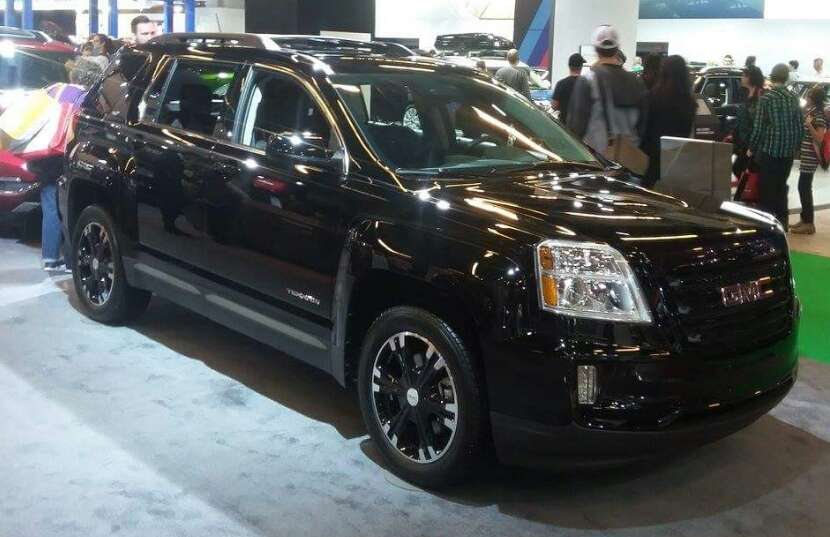
2017 Terrain SLT Nightfall Edition

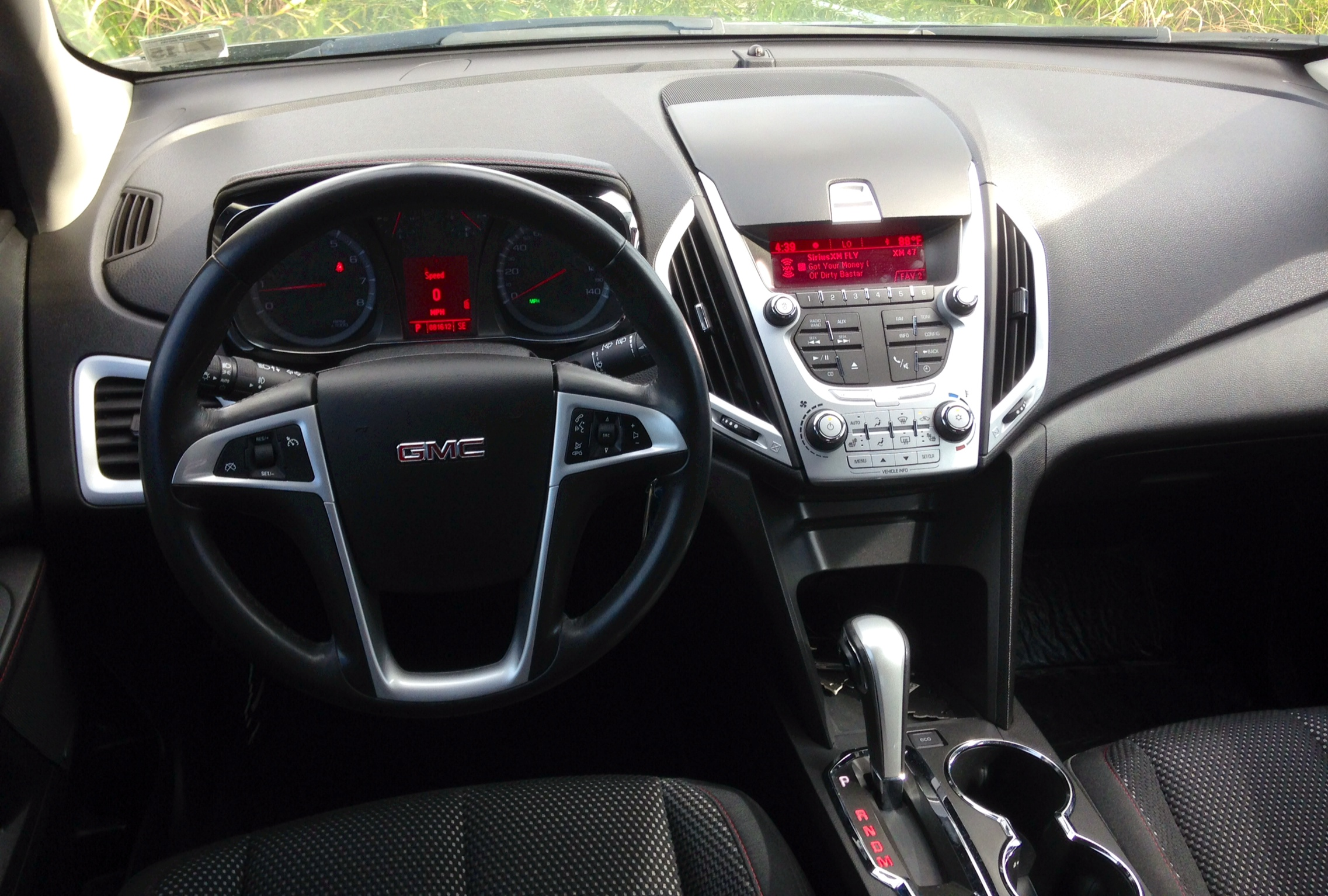
Interior

=== Engines ===
The first-generation Terrain was powered by a choice of two engines, a 2.4-liter four-cylinder and a V6 engine that was upgraded from 3.0 liters of displacement to 3.6 liters for 2013. Flex-fuel (E85) capability was offered as an option on four-cylinder models from 2012 to 2017 (2015–2017 FWD only) and V6 models from 2011 to 2014.

Years	Engine	Power	Torque	Availability
2010–2011	2.4 L Ecotec LAF I4	182 hp (136 kW; 185 PS)	172 lb⋅ft (233 N⋅m; 24 kg⋅m)	All models
2012–2017	2.4 L Ecotec LEA I4	182 hp (136 kW; 185 PS)	172 lb⋅ft (233 N⋅m; 24 kg⋅m)	All models
2010–2012	3.0 L High Feature LF1/LFW V6	264 hp (197 kW; 268 PS)	222 lb⋅ft (301 N⋅m; 31 kg⋅m)	Optional on SLE-2 and SLT
2013–2017	3.6 L High Feature LFX V6	301 hp (224 kW; 305 PS)	272 lb⋅ft (369 N⋅m; 38 kg⋅m)	Optional on SLE-2, SLT, and Denali

Notes:

- All four-cylinder models have a single rear exhaust port (on the left), while all V6 models have dual rear exhaust ports.
- All ratings are on regular gasoline.

=== Natural gas version ===
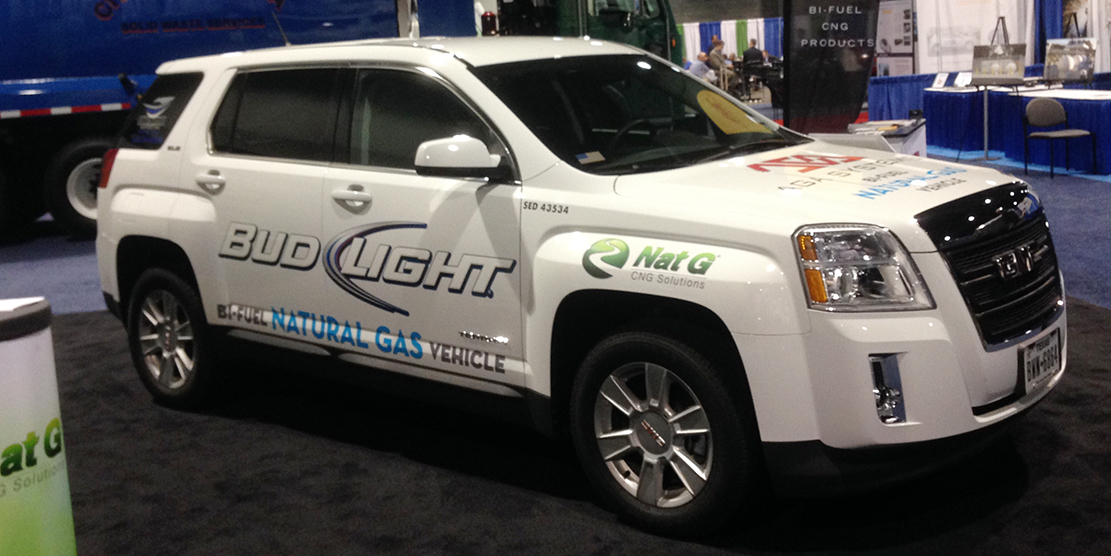
Natural Gas GMC Terrain at the NGVA Show in Atlanta November, 2013

In 2013, Nat G CNG Solutions in Houston, Texas, and AGA Systems in Salt Lake City, Utah, began offering a Compressed Natural Gas (CNG) version of the Terrain and the Chevrolet Equinox using the 2.4L Direct Injection engine. The natural gas version is a "bi-fuel" CNG vehicle, meaning it runs on either gasoline or natural gas, giving it extended range. The Terrain/Equinox were the first direct injection natural gas vehicles ever approved by the US EPA.

The CNG version was available for newly purchased Terrains through select dealers or as a retrofit on 2013 and 2014 models. Nat G CNG Solutions offered the vehicle in two options: a two-seater cargo version and a five-seat passenger version. The cargo version had an 837-mile (1,347 km) combined gasoline/natural gas highway range (9.2 gge of CNG), while the passenger version had a 775-mile (1,247 km) combined highway range (6.8 gge of CNG).

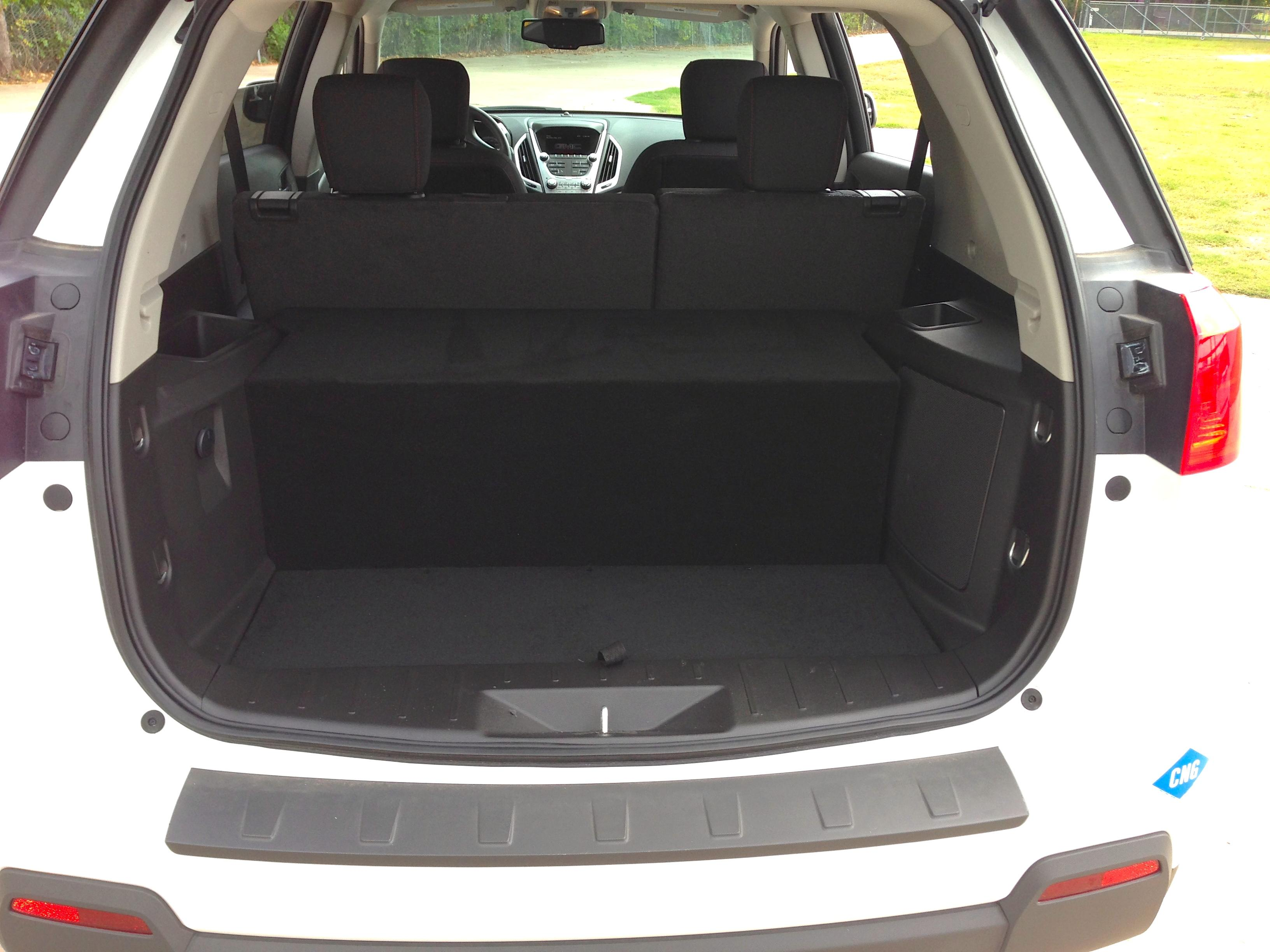
Interior of 5 Seat "Passenger Version" from Nat G CNG Solutions and AGA Systems

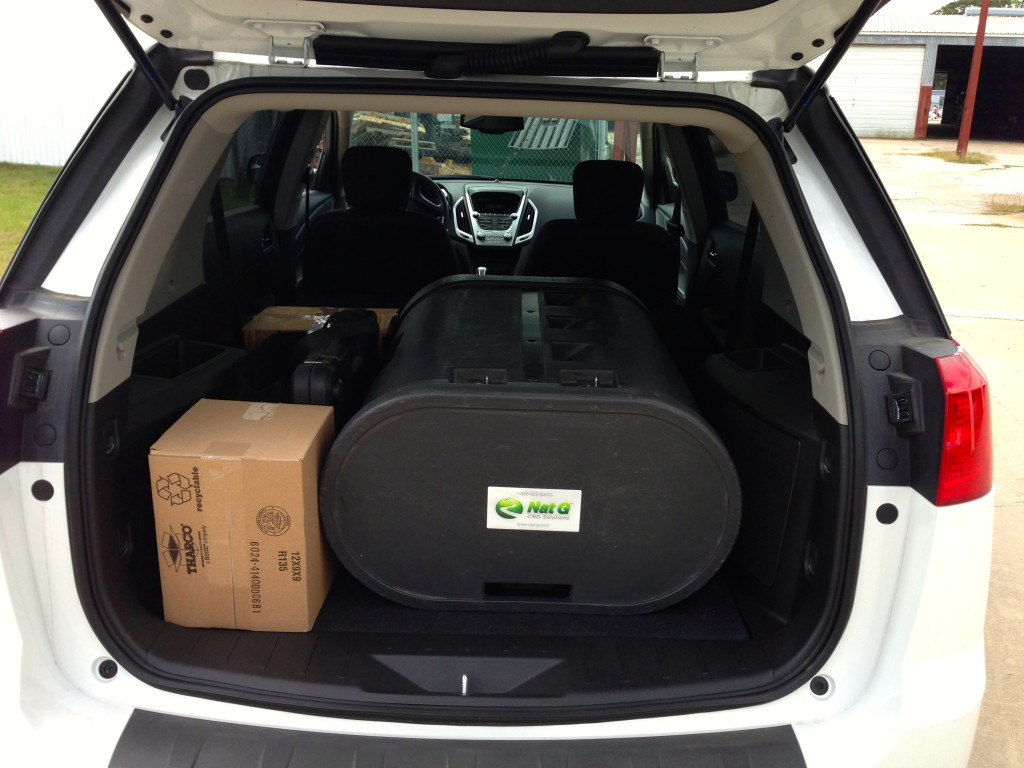
Loaded interior of "Cargo Version" from Nat G CNG Solutions and AGA Systems

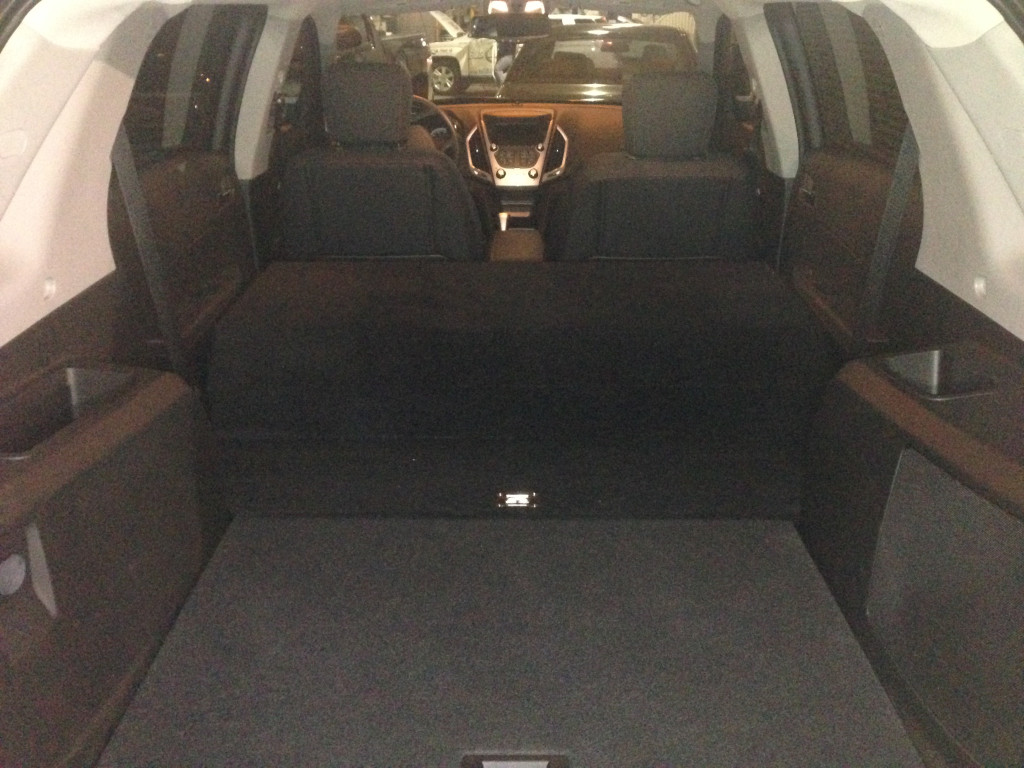
Interior of "Cargo Version" from Nat G CNG Solutions and AGA Systems

The companies claimed that the natural gas version had tested at the EPA lab at 31 mpg_{‑US} (7.6 L/100 km) highway on natural gas and had achieved a Bin 3 emissions equivalent to the Toyota Prius.

Silver Eagle Distributors, L.P., the nation's largest distributor of Anheuser-Busch products, was the launch customer for the natural gas version with an initial order of up to 100 of the natural gas versions.

=== Recall ===
In March 2022, General Motors recalled over 740,000 GMC Terrain models made from 2010 to 2017 for headlights being excessively bright. In October 2022, General Motors issued a fix for the recall by thoroughly cleaning the headlights and applying a translucent decal on the headlight.

=== Safety ===
The 2010 model year Terrain was awarded "Top Safety Pick" by IIHS, it received the highest-possible rollover protection rating of Good and achieved the Good rating for the roof strength test because its roof can withstand a force equal to four times the vehicle's weight.

IIHS scores (2010)
Moderate overlap front (original test)	Good
Side (original test)	Good
Roof strength	Good
Head restraints and seats	Good

== Second generation (2018) ==
Second generation
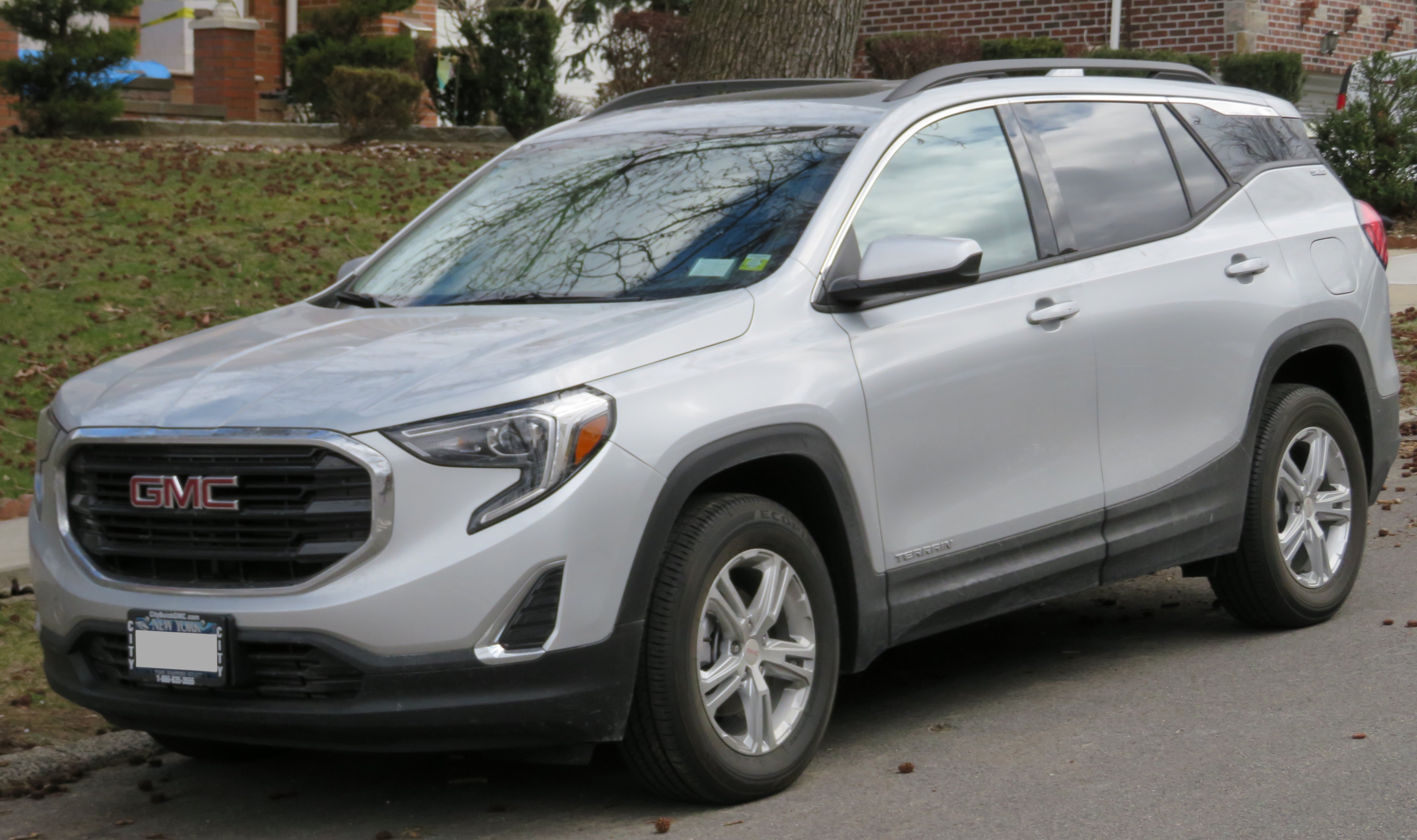

Overview
- Production: 2017–2024
- Model years: 2018–2024
- Assembly: Mexico: San Luis Potosí

Body and chassis
- Platform: GM D2XX
- Related: Chevrolet Equinox (third generation)

Powertrain
- Engine: gasoline: 1.5 L LYX turbo I4 (2018–2022); 1.5 L LSD turbo I4 (2023–2024); 2.0 L LTG turbo I4 (2018–2020); diesel: 1.6 L LH7 turbo I4 (2018–2019)
- Transmission: 9T45 9-speed automatic (1.5 L); 9T50 9-speed automatic (2.0 L); 6T45 6-speed automatic (diesel)

Dimensions
- Wheelbase: 107.3 in (2,725 mm)
- Length: 183.1 in (4,652 mm)
- Width: 72.6 in (1,843 mm)
- Height: 65.4 in (1,661 mm)
- Curb weight: 3,327 lb (1,509 kg) (1.5 L FWD)

On January 8, 2017, the second-generation GMC Terrain was unveiled at the 2017 North American International Auto Show as a 2018 model. The second generation went on sale in Summer 2017 and was available with three turbocharged four-cylinder engine choices, including a diesel option. The headlamps and taillamps now featured LED lighting accents on all trims, and the top-of-the-line GMC Terrain Denali was initially only available with the 2.0-liter turbocharged engine, which included dual chrome exhaust tips and larger front brakes. All models now featured tempered front door glass and rear solid disc brakes.

With this generation, the interior is quite different from the contemporary Chevrolet Equinox, with all models featuring a folding front passenger seat to accommodate items up to eight feet long, a class-exclusive switch-based transmission shifter, under-console pass-through storage area, a storage compartment above the glove box, and a leather-wrapped steering wheel. Standard technology features included a larger Driver Information Center screen, seven-inch touch-screen infotainment system with Apple CarPlay and Android Auto capability, four USB ports (including one Type-C port), keyless open and start (including passive entry on all doors), drive mode selection system, active grille shutters, second-row HVAC, electronic parking brake, and rear-seat reminder. SLE and SLT diesel models received more standard features than their gasoline-powered counterparts.

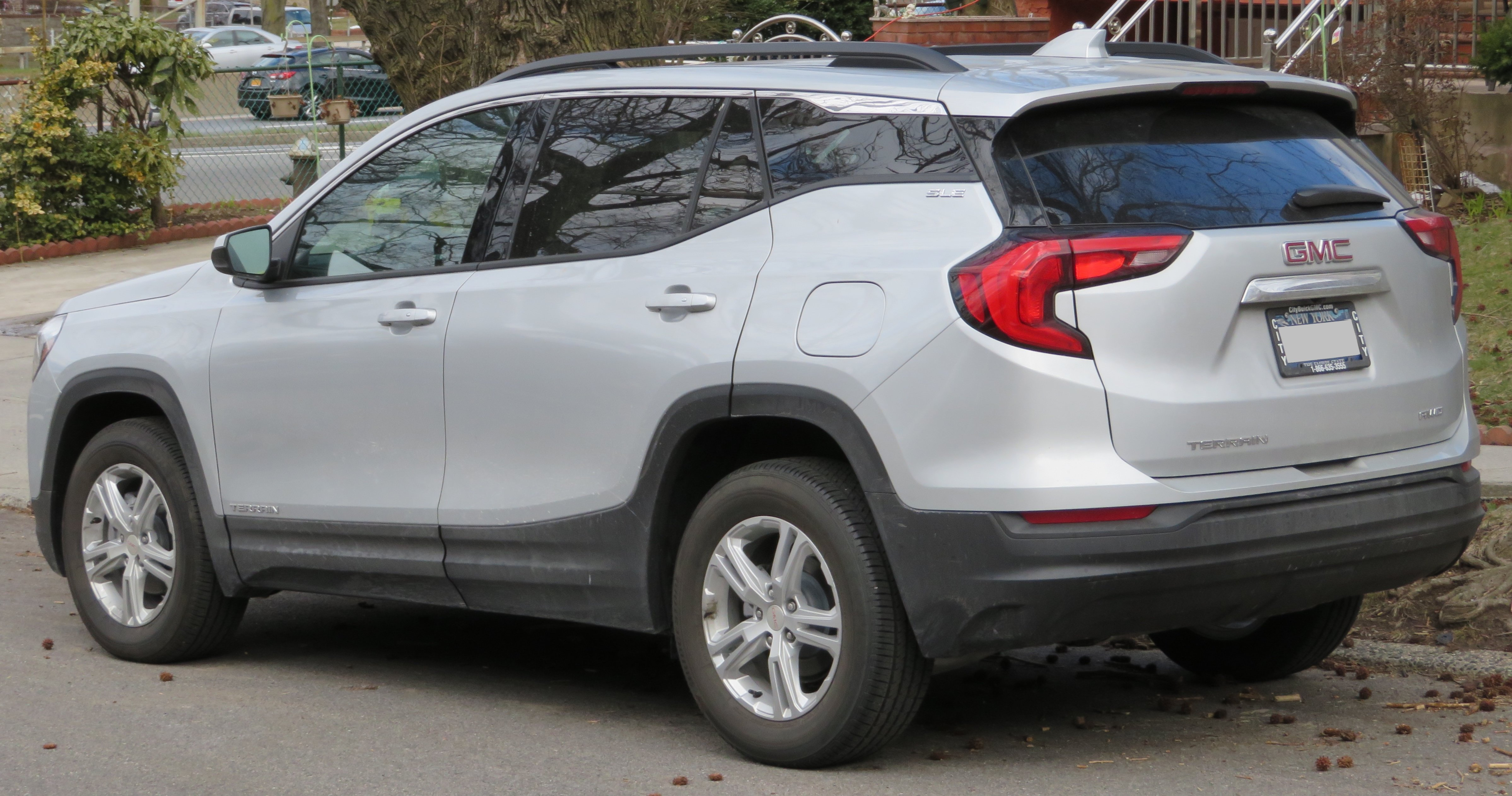
Rear view

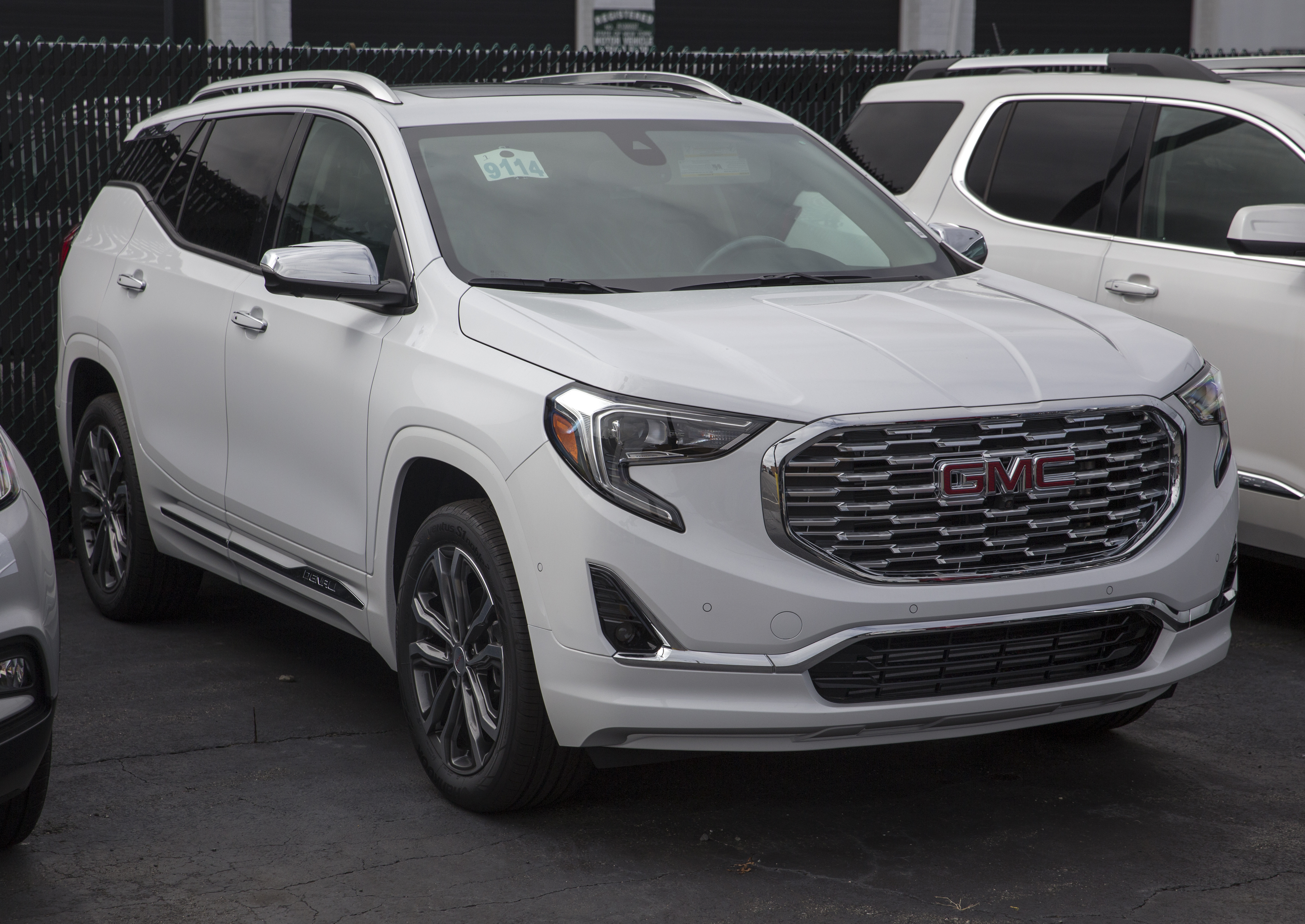
GMC Terrain Denali

=== Updates ===
- 2019
  - New "blacked-out" appearance packages were introduced. The Dark Accent Package for SLT models features a black-painted grille, mirror caps, rear license plate appliqué, and fascia inserts. A new Terrain Black Edition package was introduced as an option on the SLE and SLT trims (except diesel). It features blacked-out 19" gloss aluminum wheels, front grille, roof side rails, exterior accents, mirror caps, and exterior badging.
  - Several new technology features became available, including adaptive cruise control, front pedestrian braking, and higher-resolution backup and 360-degree cameras. Wireless charging is now standard on the Denali trim, and all SLE models now feature a 4.2-inch color LCD driver information screen. The Cargo Package no longer includes an integrated cargo liner.
- 2020
  - The diesel engine option has been discontinued, and the 2.0-liter engine is no longer available on the SLE trim.
  - Road safety features, such as automatic emergency braking, forward collision alert, lane-centering, lane-departure warning, front pedestrian braking, and following-distance sensing systems, as well as automatic high-beam headlamps, are now standard on all Terrain models.
  - Denali models now have upgraded shocks and struts with an internal valve, as well as front parking sensors in addition to rear parking sensors.
  - The Black Edition package has been renamed to Elevation Edition.
- 2021
  - Due to low demand, the 2.0-liter turbocharged four-cylinder engine has been discontinued, making the 1.5-liter engine the sole engine option for the Terrain. As a result, the Denali trim was not available to order until May 2021.
  - The trailering package and trailer hitch, which were only available with the 2.0-liter engine, have been discontinued.
  - The chrome package for SLT models has been discontinued.
  - A cold air grille shutter, which employs temperature-sensitive springs to limit water accumulation during engine warmup in cold weather, is included with the optional engine block heater.

==== 2022 refresh ====
The refreshed version of the GMC Terrain debuted at the 2020 Chicago Auto Show in February 2020. It was initially planned to go on sale in mid-2020 for the 2021 model year, but production issues and the COVID-19 recession led General Motors to cancel the GMC Terrain facelift in March 2020. GM had also planned to offer the 2.0-liter turbocharged LSY engine in the Terrain, but that never came to pass. The GMC Terrain refresh would instead go on sale in Summer 2021 for the 2022 model year, alongside the refreshed version of the Chevrolet Equinox.

The refreshed Terrain features an updated front and rear end, exterior LED lamps, interior, and emblem lettering. Trim levels now include SLE, SLT, the new AT4, and later, Denali. The low-end SL trim has been discontinued, and the Denali and AT4 trims are available only with all-wheel drive. The AT4 trim features a steel skid plate, black-painted rims, off-road tires, and unique badging. LED signature daytime running lamps, Wireless Apple CarPlay and Android Auto, engine start/stop disable switch, and automatic air conditioning are now standard on all models. A head-up display is available on SLT and AT4 models. The Elevation Edition package has been discontinued.

For 2023, the Terrain gained an updated version of the 1.5-liter engine (RPO code LSD), featuring a higher-pressure fuel system and slightly increased horsepower, as well as an electro-hydraulic braking system.

For 2024, the final model year of this generation, there were no major changes other than additional standard safety features on the AT4 trim.

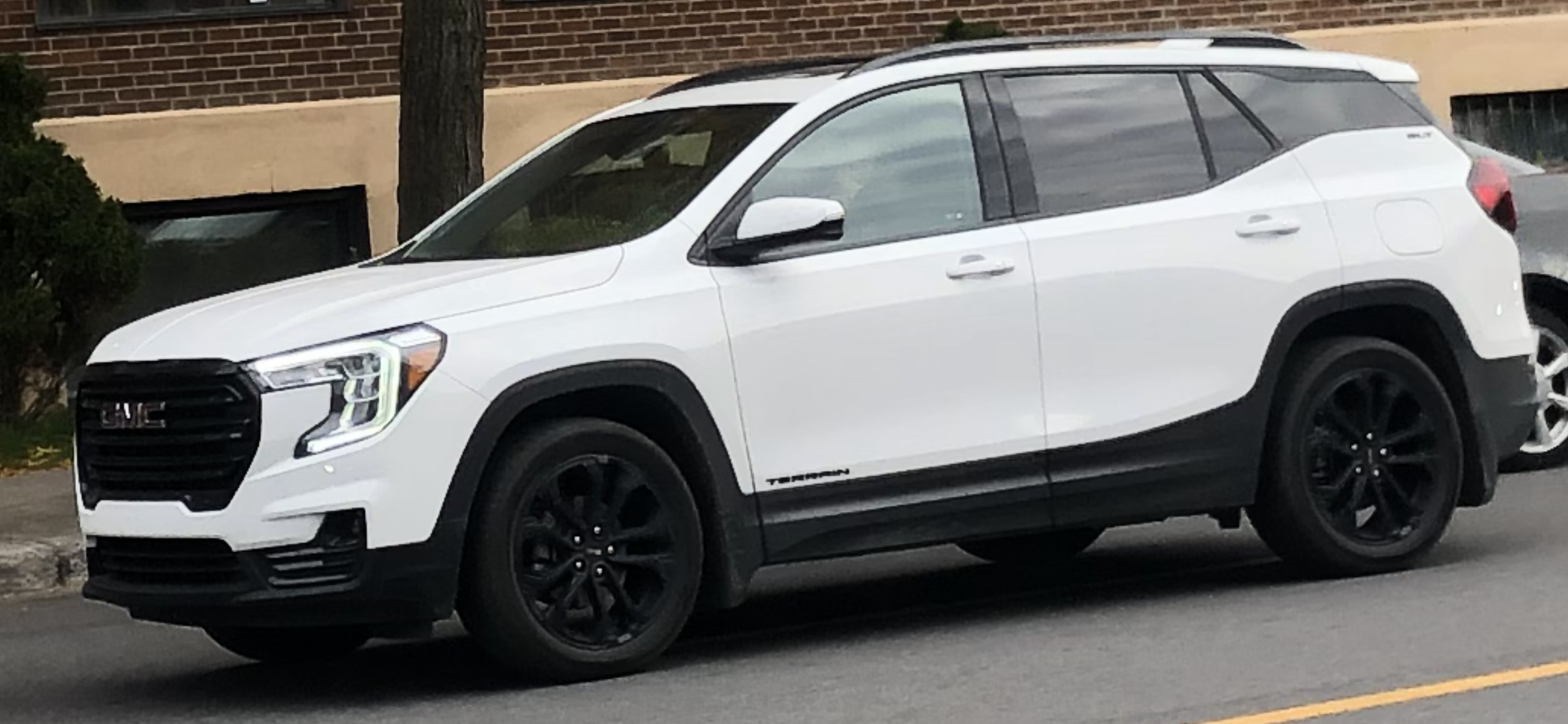
2022 GMC Terrain

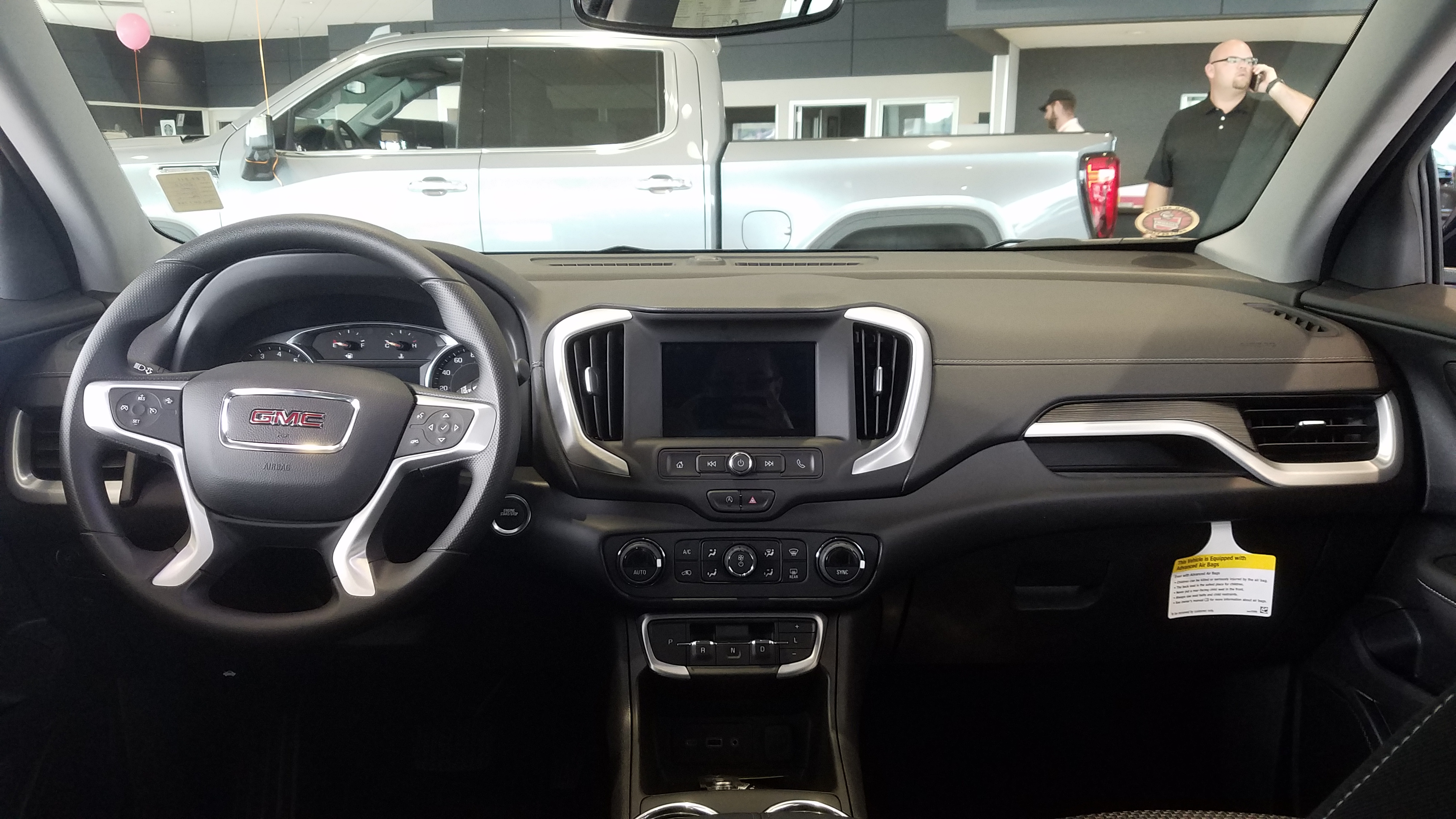
Interior

=== Safety ===
IIHS scores (2021)
Small overlap front (Driver)	Good
Small overlap front (Passenger)	Good
Moderate overlap front	Good
Side (original test)	Good
Side (updated test)	Marginal
Roof strength	Good
Head restraints and seats	Good
Headlights	Poor
Front crash prevention (Vehicle-to-Vehicle)	Superior
Front crash prevention (Vehicle-to-Pedestrian, day)	Advanced

IIHS scores (2022)
Small overlap front (Driver)	Good
Small overlap front (Passenger)	Good
Moderate overlap front	Good
Side (original test)	Good
Side (updated test)	Marginal
Roof strength	Good
Head restraints and seats	Good

== Third generation (2025) ==
Third generation
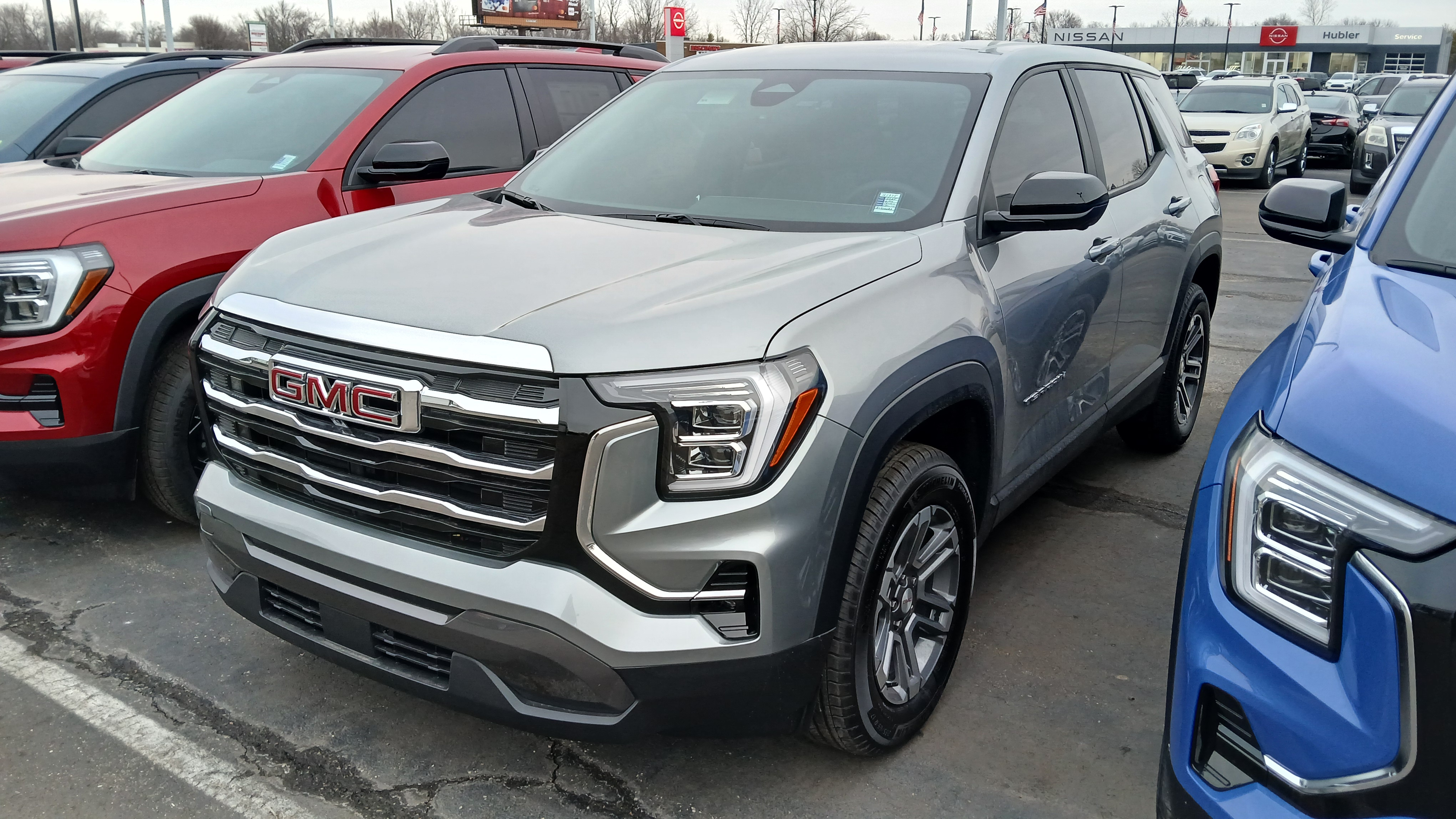

Overview
- Production: 2024–present
- Model years: 2025–present
- Assembly: Mexico: San Luis Potosí (San Luis Potosí Assembly)

Body and chassis
- Class: Compact crossover SUV
- Platform: GM VSS-S (D2XX)
- Related: Chevrolet Equinox

Powertrain
- Engine: Gasoline: 1.5 L LSD turbo I4
- Transmission: CVT (2025–26 FWD); 8-speed automatic (AWD, and 2027–present FWD)

Dimensions
- Wheelbase: 107.5 in (2,730 mm)
- Length: 183.2 in (4,653 mm)
- Width: 74.9 in (1,902 mm)
- Height: 65.6 in (1,666 mm)

General Motors unveiled the third-generation GMC Terrain on August 12, 2024. Production began on October 14, 2024, at the San Luis Potosí plant in Mexico.

This generation of the GMC Terrain features a totally redesigned interior and exterior. The redesigned exterior gives the crossover a more rugged, truck-like appearance, aligning it closely with the rest of the GMC lineup. Key exterior features include C-shaped lighting signatures in the headlights and taillights, a grille design similar to GMC’s larger trucks, and standard 17-inch wheels. For the first time, the Terrain could be had with 20-inch wheels on the Denali trim as well as two-tone paint with roof in black or gray. This generation rides on a slightly updated version of the Delta (D2XX) platform, and the overall footprint is similar to the previous-generation Terrain.

The interior contains an updated 15-inch-diagonal LCD infotainment screen, an 11-inch-diagonal LCD-based driver information center, and new emergency braking features. The transmission shifter has been relocated to the steering column. Other convenience and safety features include up to eight available camera views, 5G Wi-Fi, and windshield wiper de-icing grid. However, the folding front passenger seat from the previous generation has been discontinued.

The powertrain is a 1.5-liter turbocharged engine carried over from the previous generation, but mated to a continuously variable transmission (for front-wheel-drive models) or an eight-speed automatic transmission (for all-wheel-drive models). The engine produces up to 174 horsepower and 184 (on FWD) or 203 lb-ft (on AWD) of torque. The new powertrain has marginally better city fuel economy ratings compared to the previous generation.

The third-generation Terrain was initially only available in the Elevation trim level with all-wheel drive, with a front-wheel-drive model following later. For 2026, the AT4 and Denali trim levels became available, but only in all-wheel drive.

For 2027, the CVT was discontinued, and all models now featured the 8-speed automatic transmission.

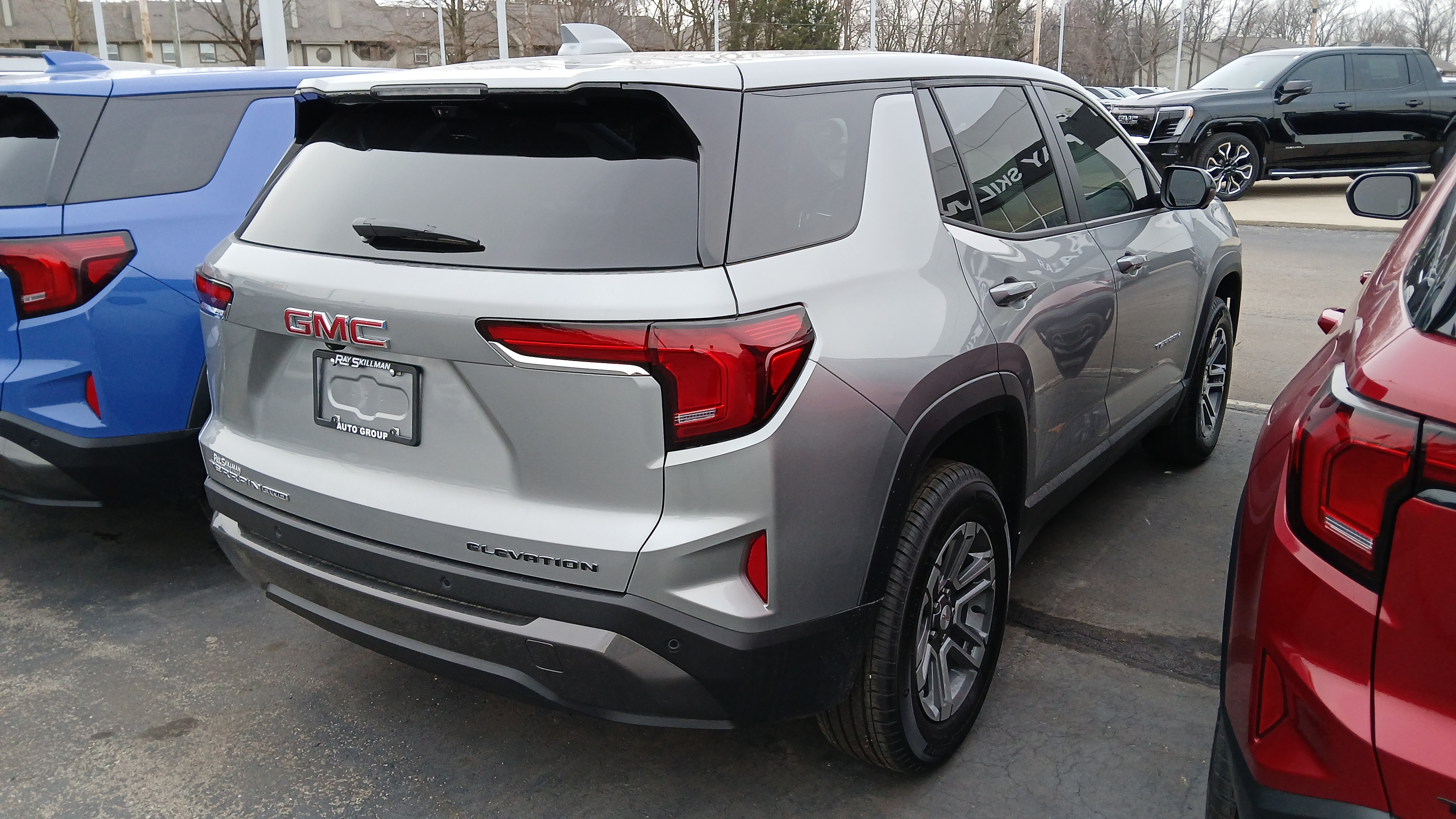
Rear view

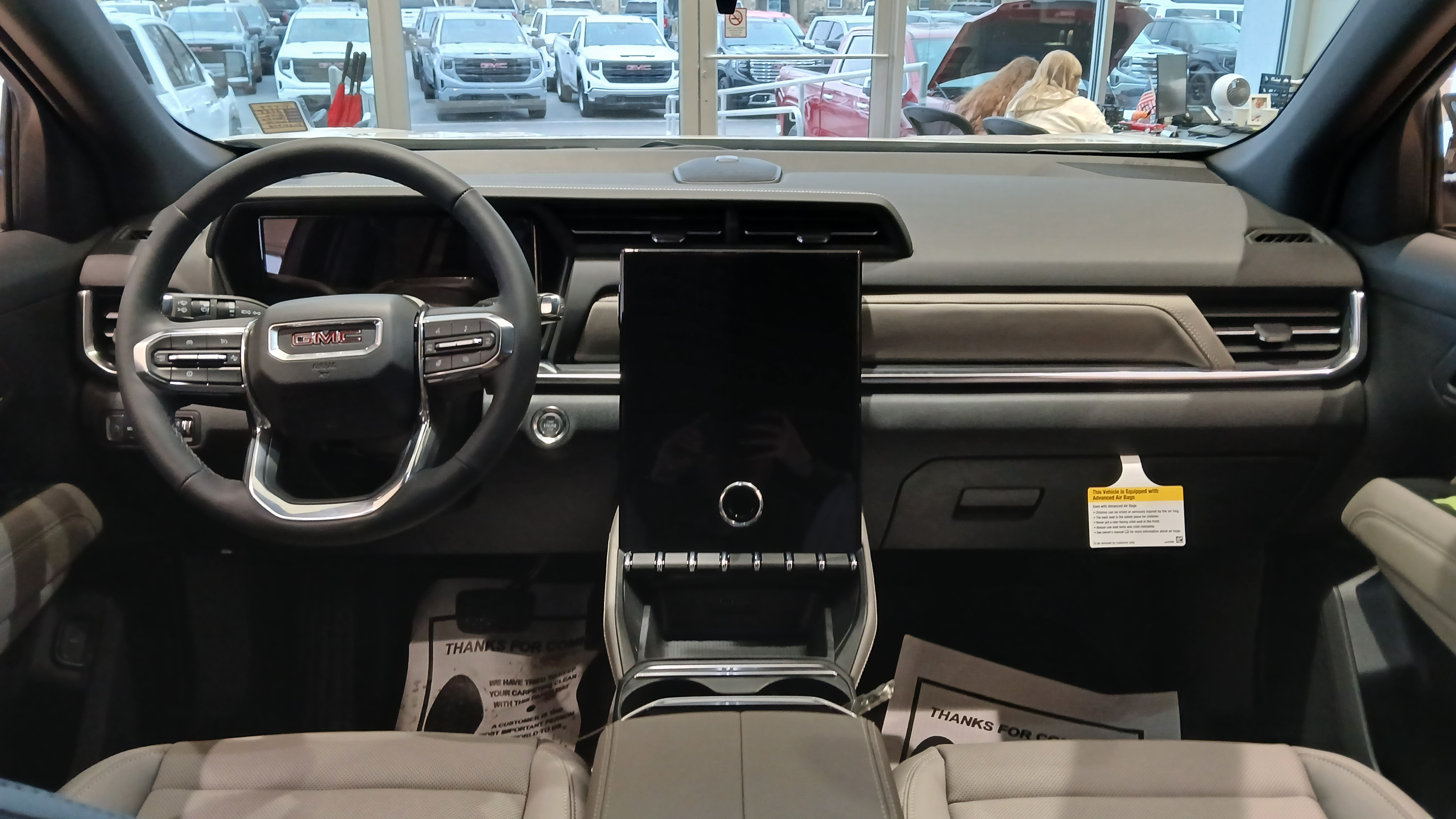
Interior

== Sales ==
Calendar year	Sales (US)
2009	14,033
2010	60,519
2011	83,179
2012	97,786
2013	99,525
2014	105,016
2015	112,030
2016	87,925
2017	85,441
2018	114,314
2019	101,470
2020	86,020
2021	47,488
2022	86,567
2023	71,857
2024	82,100
2025	74,975
