= Venkata Padmanabhan =

Indian computer scientist

- Education: IIT Delhi; University of California, Berkeley
- Known for: Research in networked and mobile systems
- Awards: 2016 Shanti Swarup Bhatnagar Prize
- Scientific career
- Fields: Networking; Mobile computing
- Workplaces: Microsoft; Microsoft India
- Doctoral advisor: Randy Katz; Domenico Ferrari

Venkata Narayana Padmanabhan is a computer scientist and the managing director at Microsoft Research India. He is known for his research in networked and mobile systems. He is an elected fellow of the Indian National Academy of Engineering, Institute of Electrical and Electronics Engineers and the Association for Computing Machinery. The Council of Scientific and Industrial Research, the apex agency of the Government of India for scientific research, awarded him the Shanti Swarup Bhatnagar Prize for Science and Technology, one of the highest Indian science awards for his contributions to Engineering Sciences in 2016.

== Biography ==
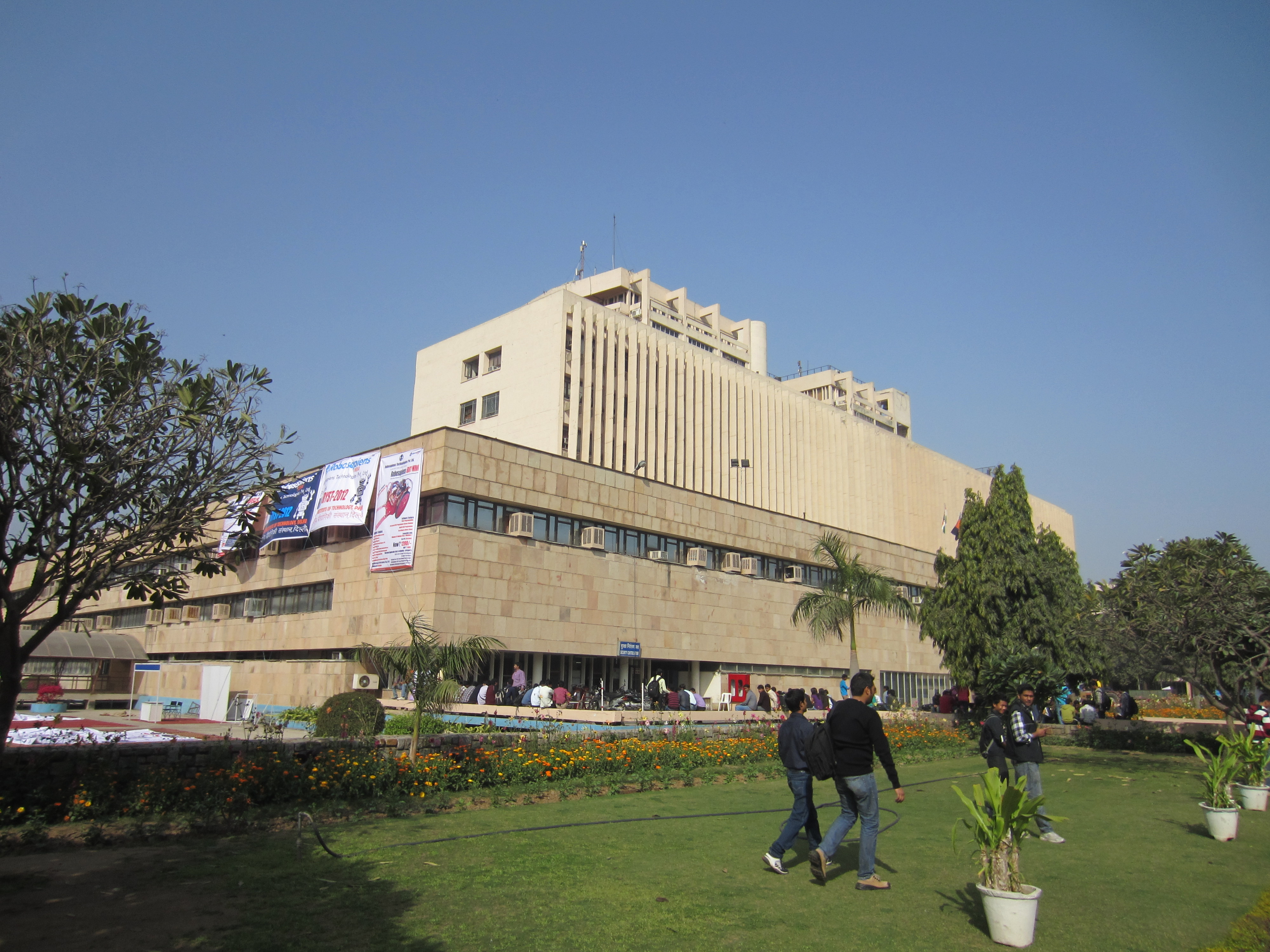
IIT Delhi

Padmanabhan did his graduate studies in computer Science and Engineering at the Indian Institute of Technology, Delhi and after earning a BTech in 1993, he pursued his higher studies at University of California, Berkeley from where he secured a master's degree (MS) under the guidance of Domenico Ferrari in 1995 and a PhD, advised by Randy Katz in 1998. With Katz, he worked on Web Data Transport and his thesis, Addressing the Challenges of Web Data Transport. Starting his career at Microsoft Research Redmond, US, he served there for over 8 years before returning to India and founding the Mobility, Networks and Systems group at Microsoft Research India in 2007. He was appointed deputy managing director in 2018 and took over as the managing director in 2024. He has also been an adjunct professor in the EECS Division at the Indian Institute of Science since 2018.

Padmanabhan has done extensive research on Indoor positioning systems, smartphone-based sensing, and mobile communication and his work has resulted in the development of technologies which is being used by Microsoft in their products. He has documented his researches by way of several articles; (Note: Please see Articles section) He has been involved with the organization of ACM SIGCOMM conferences and served as the general co-chair of the 2010 edition in New Delhi and as the program co-chair of the 2012 edition. He has served on the editorial boards of journals such as ACM SIGCOMM Computer Communication Review, IEEE/ACM Transactions on Networking, and IEEE Transactions on Mobile Computing. and chaired the Award Committee for ACM SIGMOBILE Test-of-Time Paper Award in 2017 and the ACM SIGCOMM Test-of-Time Paper Award in 2022.

== Awards and honors ==
The Association for Computing Machinery elected Padmanabhan as a Distinguished Scientist in 2009 and as a Fellow in 2016. He was elected a Fellow of Institute of Electrical and Electronics Engineers in 2012 and of the Indian National Academy of Engineering in 2014. The Council of Scientific and Industrial Research awarded him the Shanti Swarup Bhatnagar Prize, one of the highest Indian science awards in 2016. The following year, Padmanabhan became a laureate of the Asian Scientist 100 by the Asian Scientist. He has also received test-of-time paper awards from ACM SIGMOBILE in 2016 and 2019, ACM SenSys in 2019, and ACM SIGMM in 2020 (Honourable Mention for 2002). He was also among those recognized with the SIGCOMM Networking Systems Award 2020 for being among the "leading source code committers to ns-2".

== Selected bibliography ==
=== Books ===
- Venkata Narayana Padmanabhan (1998). Addressing the Challenges of Web Data Transport. University of California, Berkeley.

=== Articles ===
- Paramvir Bahl, Venkata N. Padmanabhan, Anand Balachandran (2000). "Enhancements to the RADAR User Location and Tracking System". Microsoft Research.
- Venkata N. Padmanabhan, Lakshminarayanan Subramanian (2001). "An investigation of geographic mapping techniques for internet hosts". ACM SIGCOMM Computer Communication Review. 31 (4): 173–185. doi:10.1145/964723.383073.
- Ashwin R. Bharambe, Cormac Herley, Venkata N. Padmanabhan (2005). "Analyzing and Improving BitTorrent Performance". Microsoft Research.
- Kamal Jain, Jitendra Padhye, Venkata N. Padmanabhan, Lili Qiu (2005). "Impact of interference on multi-hop wireless network performance". Wireless Networks. 11 (4): 471–487. doi:10.1007/s11276-005-1769-9. S2CID 45623430.
- Prashanth Mohan, Venkata N. Padmanabhan, Ramachandran Ramjee (2008). "Nericell". Proceedings of the 6th ACM conference on Embedded network sensor systems. pp. 323–336. doi:10.1145/1460412.1460444. hdl:11323/7458. ISBN 9781595939906. S2CID 15670816.

== See also ==
- Nericell
- BitTorrent
- Mesh networking
- Location-based service
