= ZMW =

ZMW can mean:

- Zero-mode waveguide
- ZMW attack, a hypothetical denial-of-service attack on the Internet's routing infrastructure
- Zambian kwacha, the ISO 4217 code for the currency of Zambia
