= List of ITS associations =

This is a list of ITS (intelligent transportation systems) associations.

ITS organisations are present worldwide. The work of these associations is often supported by local governments The estimated worth of the market is US$9.6 Billion (2014–2015) In 2015, the intelligent transportation system (ITS) market in roadways was valued at US$20.94 billion

== ITS organisations ==
=== Africa ===
- ITS Africa with the regional members
- ITS Ethiopia
- ITS Nigeria
- ITS South Africa

=== Americas ===
- ITS Argentina
- ITS America
- ITS Brasil
- ITS Canada
- ITS Chile
- ITS Colombia
- ITS México

=== Asia ===
- ITS Israel
- ITS Turkey is member of ERTICO, the European organisation

=== Asia Pacific ===
- ITS Asia-Pacific with the regional members
- ITS Australia
- ITS China
- ITS Hongkong
- ITS Japan
- ITS Indonesia assisted by the Japan International Cooperation Agency (JICA)
- ITS Korea
- ITS Malaysia
- ITS New Zealand
- ITS Singapore
- ITS Taiwan
- ITS Thailand

=== Europe ===
In Europe the European Union, by the European Commission through financial instruments and through legislative instruments are supported innovative projects in IST directly as well by the regional ITS.

- ITS Europe is represented by ERTICO
- ITS Belgium.
- ITS Denmark
- ITS France
- ITS Deutschland
- ITS Hellas
- ITS Italia
- RDW Netherlands
- ITS-Norge
- ITS Polska
- ITS России
- ITS España
- ITS Sverige

== See also ==
- List of countries by motor vehicle production
