= Seshan =

Seshan is a surname. Notable people with the surname include:

- Srinivasan Seshan, American computer scientist and professor
- N. K. Seshan (1927–1986), Indian politician
- T. N. Seshan (1932–2019), Former Chief Election Commissioner of India

== See also ==
- Seshan, Russia, an abandoned village in Chukotsky District, Chukotka Autonomous Okrug
