= Alvisi =

Alvisi is a surname. Notable people with the surname include:

- Alessandro Alvisi (1887–1951), Italian horse rider
- Juri Alvisi (born 1977), Italian bicycle racer
- Lorenzo Alvisi, Italian computer scientist
