= Michael Dahlin =

Michael (Mike) Dahlin is a computer engineer working with distributed systems, operating systems, and cloud computing. He currently serves as an Engineering Fellow at Google, where he leads the technical direction for Google Compute Engine and Borg, focusing on enhancing reliability, efficiency, and scalability, particularly in machine learning data centers.

== Education and career ==
Dahlin's academic journey includes a Ph.D. in Computer Science from the University of California at Berkeley, completed in 1995 under the supervision of Professors David Patterson and Thomas Anderson. His dissertation focused on "Serverless Network File Systems."

Before joining Google, Dahlin was a professor of Computer Science at the University of Texas at Austin from 1996 to 2014. His research during this period encompassed distributed systems, data replication, fault tolerance, and security. He co-authored the textbook "Operating Systems: Principles and Practice," which is used in computer science education.

Dahlin's work continues in the development of reliable and efficient large-scale computing systems, bridging academic research and practical applications in the industry. Dahlin has continued to contribute to the field of computer science, particularly in distributed systems and cloud computing. Dahlin served on the selection committee for the 2023 SIGOPS Hall of Fame Award, which honors operating systems papers and has also served on the Steering Committee of the International Workshop on Cloud Intelligence / AIOps since 2020 in conjunction with the ICSE, AAAI, MLSys, and ASPLOS conferences.

== Awards and honors ==
Throughout his career, Dahlin has been recognized with several prestigious awards, including:

- 2014 Business Insider's "One of The 39 Most Important People in Cloud Computing"
- 2010 ACM Fellow for contributions to the science and engineering of large-scale distributed computer systems.
- 2004–2007 IEEE Fellow for contributions to scalable networked systems.
- 2004 NSF CAREER Award
- 2000 Alfred P. Sloan Research Fellowship

== Selected publications ==
Dahlin has authored over 70 peer-reviewed papers, with ten receiving best paper awards, reflecting his impact on the field. The following are the most cited as of 2024:

- Michael D. Dahlin, Randolph Y. Wang, Thomas E. Anderson, David A. Patterson "Cooperative caching: Using remote client memory to improve file system performance"(1994)
- Ramakrishna Kotla, Lorenzo Alvisi, Mike Dahlin, Allen Clement, Edmund Wong "Zyzzyva: speculative byzantine fault tolerance"(2007)
- Thomas E. Anderson, Michael D. Dahlin, Jeanna M. Neefe, David A. Patterson, Drew S. Roselli, Randolph Y. Wang "Serverless network file systems"(1995)
