= Meng Wang =

Chinese-German engineer and transport scientist

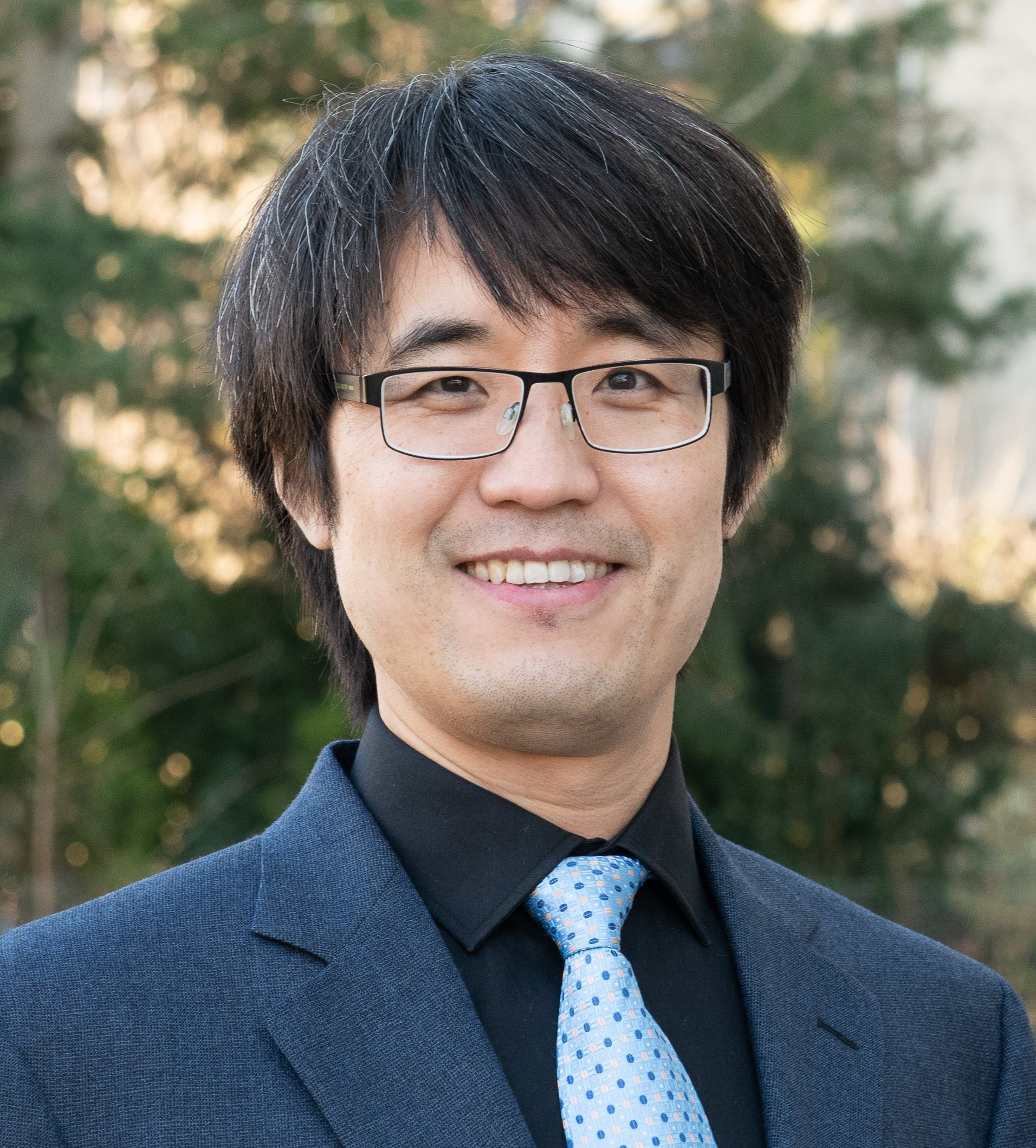
- Born: Beijing, China
- Education: Tsinghua University; Research Institute of Highway, Ministry of Transport (China); Delft University of Technology
- Known for: Traffic flow modelling, cooperative driving, connected and automated vehicle control
- Awards: IEEE Intelligent Transportation Systems Society Best Dissertation Award, second prize (2015)
- Scientific career
- Fields: Transport science, intelligent transportation systems, traffic flow modelling, connected and automated vehicles
- Institutions: TU Dresden; Delft University of Technology
- Doctoral advisor: Serge Hoogendoorn; Bart van Arem; Winnie Daamen
- Website: tud.link/eaehyg

Meng Wang is a Chinese-born engineer and researcher who serves as a Full Professor (W3) and the Head of the Chair of Traffic Process Automation at the "Friedrich List" Faculty of Transport and Traffic Sciences at TU Dresden, Germany. He is recognized for his work in intelligent transportation systems (ITS), specifically the modeling and control of automated vehicles and their impact on traffic flow stability.

== Education and early career ==
Wang studied at Tsinghua University in Beijing, receiving a Bachelor of Engineering in Civil Engineering in 2003. He then attended the Research Institute of Highway (RIOH), Ministry of Transport, China, where he earned a Master of Science in Traffic and Transport Planning and Management in 2006.

He moved to the Netherlands for his doctoral studies at the Delft University of Technology (TU Delft). In 2014, he completed his PhD with distinction under the joint supervision of Serge Hoogendoorn, Bart van Arem, and Winnie Daamen. His dissertation received the 2015 IEEE ITS Society Best PhD Dissertation Award (2nd Prize).

== Academic career ==
Between 2015 and 2021, Wang held various academic positions at TU Delft, including Tenured Assistant Professor and Co-Director of the Electric and Automated Transport Research Lab (hEAT Lab).

On 1 December 2021, he was appointed to the Chair of Traffic Process Automation at TU Dresden. His research involves multimodal traffic processes, control strategies for connected and automated vehicles (CAVs), and data-driven traffic state estimation.

== Research ==
Wang’s research addresses the modelling, control, and optimization of traffic systems, with a focus on connected and automated vehicles, traffic flow stability, and human–machine interaction in transport systems.

== Editorial roles and service ==
- Associate Editor, IEEE Transactions on Intelligent Transportation Systems
- Editorial Board Member, Transportation Research Part C: Emerging Technologies
- Associate Editor, IET Intelligent Transport Systems
- Vice President, Europe Chapter of the Chinese Overseas Transportation Association (COTA)
