= DalTrans =

DalTrans is the means by which traffic information is gathered and disseminated in Dallas, Texas. DalTrans is an Intelligent Transportation System operated by the Texas Department of Transportation, a collection of devices and a communications backbone designed to help alleviate the freeway congestion. Traffic Data Collected by DalTrans is available in real time to the public on its website.

Dallas, Texas is a city with an ever-increasing traffic congestion problem. This is primarily due to the enormous growth of the Dallas area suburbs. Due to the additional vehicles on the Dallas area freeways, there is a shortage of both the room and the resources required to build more capacity. The approach being taken is to operate the freeways in a more efficient manner. This approach requires the gathering of traffic information and the dissemination of that information to the traveling public.

Operators in the DalTrans traffic management center monitor the freeway conditions, dispatch assistance to stranded motorists on the freeways via Courtesy Patrol, and share the information about the freeway conditions to the motorists as well as the media. This information can help the motorist make an informed decision about what routes to take and what routes to avoid. The DalTrans operators work closely with the Dallas Area Rapid Transit (DART), surrounding cities, and various traffic reporting agencies in sharing up-to-the-minute traffic conditions and to find solutions to our transportation problems.

Since the DalTrans operations center opened in the summer of 1997, it has enhanced the Courtesy Patrol operation already offered to the motoring public by adding real-time freeway traffic conditions to travelers on the system.
