= Chen-Nee Chuah =

American computer scientist

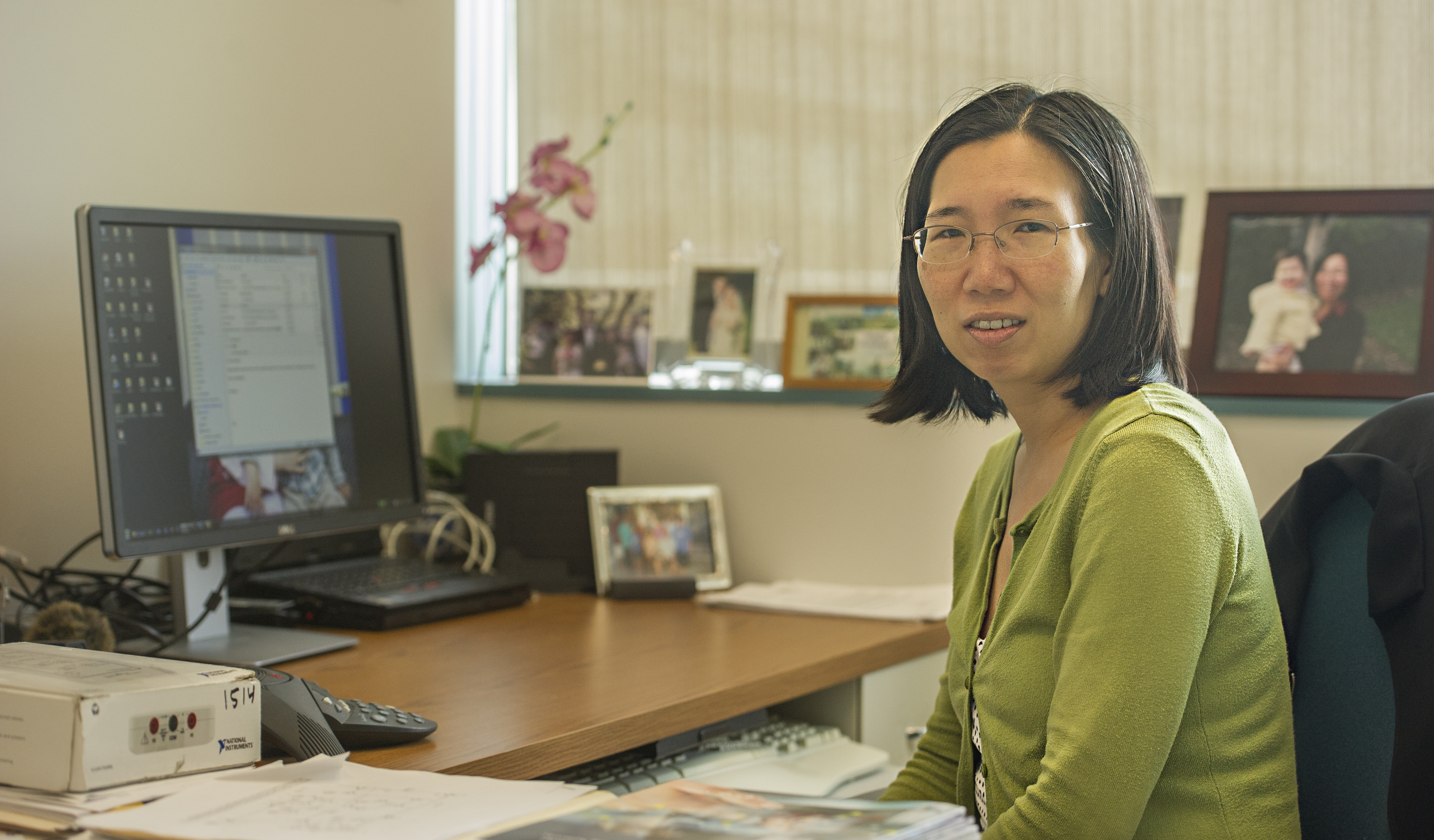
Image of CHen Nee Chua

Chen-Nee Chuah is an American computer scientist and computer engineer whose research involves computer networks, including network traffic measurement, wireless ad hoc networks, and intelligent transportation systems. She is the Child Family Professor in Engineering, in the Department of Electrical & Computer Engineering at the University of California, Davis.

== Education and career ==
Chuah studied electrical engineering as an undergraduate at Rutgers University, graduating in 1995. She went to the University of California, Berkeley for graduate study in electrical engineering and computer sciences, and earned a master's degree and Ph.D. there. Her 2001 doctoral dissertation, A Scalable Framework for IP-Network Resource Provisioning Through Aggregation and Hierarchical Control, was supervised by Randy Katz.

After postdoctoral research at Sprint Advanced Technology Laboratories, she joined the UC Davis faculty in 2002. She was named as the Child Family Professor in Engineering in 2020.

== Recognition ==
In 2012, she was selected as an ACM Distinguished Member. Chuah was elected as an IEEE Fellow in 2015, "for contributions to MIMO communications and network management". She was named an AAAS Fellow in the 2023 class of fellows.
