= Automotive V2X antennas =

Automotive V2X antennas are specialized radio-frequency (RF) antennas designed to support vehicle-to-everything (V2X) wireless communication. These antennas enable reliable data exchange between vehicles, roadside infrastructure, pedestrians, networks, and cloud services, primarily operating in the 5.9 GHz Intelligent Transportation Systems (ITS) band.

V2X communication plays a central role in intelligent transportation systems (ITS), enabling cooperative safety applications such as collision warning, emergency electronic brake lights, and intersection collision avoidance, as well as supporting features for autonomous and semi-autonomous driving. The antennas must deliver low-latency, robust links in difficult real-world conditions, including multipath fading, shadowing caused by the vehicle body, and rapidly changing network topology.

Unlike standard mobile device antennas, automotive V2X antennas must function effectively when mounted close to large metallic vehicle surfaces, glass with embedded heating elements, plastic components with metal reinforcements, and other nearby radio systems (LTE/5G cellular, GNSS/GPS, Wi-Fi, Bluetooth, UWB, and others). This environment demands designs that maintain stable impedance, minimize detuning effects, reduce pattern distortion, and support multi-antenna configurations such as diversity and MIMO.

== Overview ==
Vehicle-to-everything (V2X) communication includes several interaction modes:

- Vehicle-to-Vehicle (V2V)
- Vehicle-to-Infrastructure (V2I)
- Vehicle-to-Pedestrian (V2P)
- Vehicle-to-Network (V2N)

These communication modes require reliable, low-latency wireless links under dynamic propagation conditions characterized by multipath fading, vehicle body shadowing, and rapid topology changes.

Antenna systems used for V2X must therefore provide:

- Near-omnidirectional azimuth coverage
- Stable impedance performance under vehicular integration
- Compatibility with multi-antenna techniques
- Compliance with regional regulatory constraints

== Frequency bands and standards ==
Automotive V2X antennas are primarily designed for operation in the 5.850–5.925 GHz band, allocated globally for ITS applications. Regional regulatory frameworks include:

- FCC (United States)
- ETSI EN 302 571 (Europe)
- 3GPP specifications for Cellular V2X

V2X communication technologies include:

- IEEE 802.11p / DSRC
- ETSI ITS-G5
- Cellular V2X (C-V2X, 3GPP Release 14 and later)

These standards define physical-layer requirements that influence antenna bandwidth, radiation pattern, and polarization characteristics.

== Design considerations ==
Unlike conventional mobile antennas, automotive V2X antennas must operate in close proximity to:

- Large metallic vehicle bodies
- Glass surfaces with heating elements
- Plastic bumpers with internal metallic reinforcements
- Co-located RF systems (LTE, GNSS, Wi-Fi, Bluetooth, UWB, AM/FM)

This integration environment affects:

- Radiation efficiency
- Impedance stability
- Mutual coupling between antennas
- Pattern distortion

As a result, automotive V2X antennas are often optimized for reduced sensitivity to detuning and vehicle-body interactions.

== Types of automotive V2X antennas ==
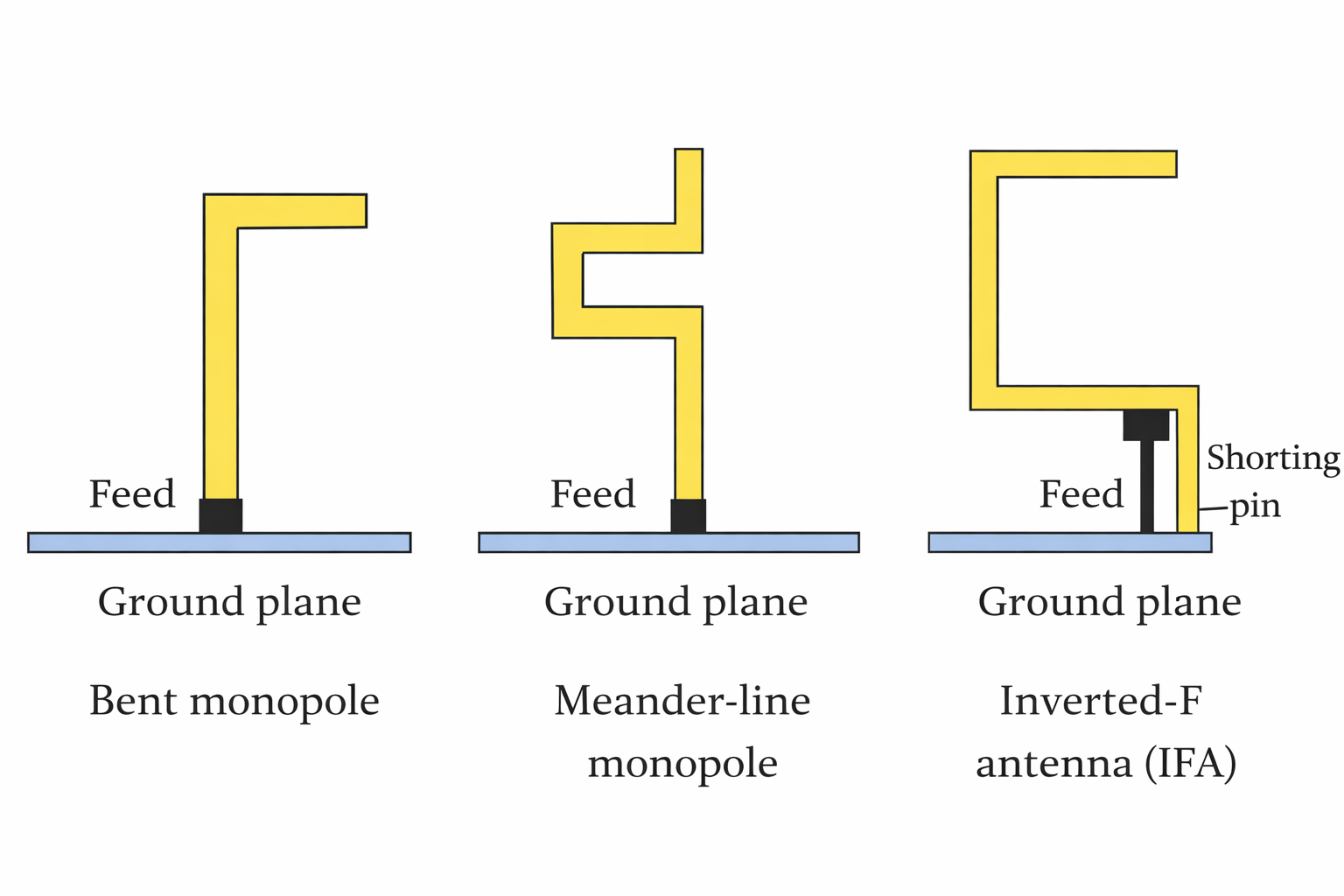
Schematic diagram showing three common types of compact PCB-based automotive antennas: Bent monopole, Meander-line monopole, and Inverted-F antenna (IFA). These designs are used to save space in modern telematics control units.

A variety of antenna architectures are used in V2X applications, depending on packaging constraints and system requirements.

=== Monopole and wire antennas ===
Quarter-wave monopoles are among the simplest V2X antenna types. When mounted on a conductive vehicle roof, they provide approximately omnidirectional coverage in the horizontal plane. Variants include shortened, loaded, and collinear designs.

=== Printed (PCB) antennas ===
Printed antennas are widely used due to their low profile and ease of integration into modules. Common types include:

- Printed monopoles
- Meandered monopoles
- Inverted-F antennas (IFA)
- Planar inverted-F antennas (PIFA)

These designs offer compact form factors suitable for roof modules and internal integration.

=== Patch antennas ===
Microstrip patch antennas are often used in roadside units (RSUs) and in applications requiring directional coverage. Circular polarization is frequently employed to mitigate polarization mismatch and multipath effects.

=== Shark-fin integrated antennas ===
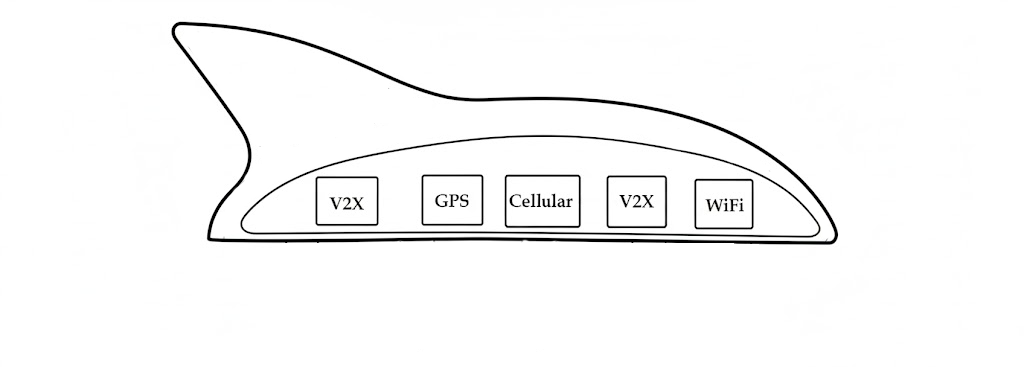
A 2D schematic diagram of a shark-fin automotive antenna housing, showing the internal placement of V2X, GPS, Cellular, and WiFi modules.

Modern vehicles often use roof-mounted “shark-fin” modules that integrate multiple antennas (e.g., LTE, GNSS, V2X). Within these modules, compact monopole, PIFA, monocone, or patch designs may be used.

=== Glass-integrated and transparent antennas ===
Printed conductive structures embedded in windshield or rear window glass enable concealed antenna integration. Transparent conductive materials and mesh-based conductors have been investigated for aesthetic and packaging advantages.

== Multi-antenna techniques in V2X ==
Due to the highly dynamic propagation environment, V2X systems frequently employ multi-antenna techniques.

=== Diversity ===
Antenna diversity techniques improve link reliability under fading conditions. Spatial, polarization, and pattern diversity configurations are commonly implemented in on-board units (OBUs) and roadside units (RSUs).

=== MIMO (Multiple-Input Multiple-Output) ===
MIMO configurations such as 2×2 and 4×4 systems are used to enhance throughput and reliability. Effective implementation requires sufficient antenna isolation and low channel correlation.

=== Beamforming ===
Beamforming techniques are increasingly applied in infrastructure-based V2X systems and advanced vehicles to extend communication range and improve interference suppression.

== Installation locations ==
Typical integration locations include:

- Vehicle roof (most common)
- Roof-mounted shark-fin modules
- Bumpers (front and rear)
- Side mirrors
- A/B/C body pillars
- Windshield or rear glass

Each installation location influences radiation characteristics and system performance due to differences in ground plane availability and surrounding materials.

== Regulatory compliance ==
Automotive V2X antenna systems must comply with regional regulatory requirements governing:

- Radiated power (EIRP)
- Out-of-band emissions
- Spectral masks

Standards such as ETSI EN 302 571 and FCC ITS band regulations define relevant constraints.

== Research and development trends ==
Recent research in automotive V2X antenna systems includes:

- Low-profile wideband monocone designs
- Compact MIMO antenna arrays
- Highly decoupled patch-based systems
- Flexible and conformal antennas
- Transparent and glass-integrated structures
- Co-located multi-radio integration strategies

These developments reflect the increasing demand for integrated vehicular communication platforms supporting safety-critical and high-data-rate applications.

== See also ==
- Vehicle-to-everything
- Intelligent transportation systems
- Automotive antenna
- MIMO
- Beamforming
- IEEE 802.11p
- Cellular V2X
