= Z. Morley Mao =

American computer scientist

Zhuoqing Morley Mao (Chinese: 茅斫青) is a computer scientist whose research concerns computer networks, network security, mobile computing, and distributed systems. She is a professor in the Department of Electrical Engineering and Computer Science at the University of Michigan.

== Education and career ==
Mao was both an undergraduate and a graduate student at the University of California, Berkeley, where she completed her Ph.D. in electrical engineering and computer science in 2003. Her doctoral dissertation, Solving the Interdomain Routing Problem-Understanding Interdomain Routing Dynamics, was supervised by Randy Katz.

She joined the University of Michigan faculty in 2004, and as an assistant professor in 2008 was named Morris Wellman Faculty Development Professor.

== Research ==
Mao is one of the namesakes of the ZMW attack, a method for bringing down the internet via a distributed denial of service attack on its routing systems. She has also found performance degradation caused by network security software, discovered defects in the sandbox used to keep Android apps secure from each other, and developed techniques by which self-driving vehicles can be tricked into failing to observe obstacles.

== Recognition ==
Mao was the 2016–2017 recipient of the George J. Huebner Jr. Research Excellence Award of the University of Michigan College of Engineering.

She was named as an IEEE Fellow in 2022, "for contributions to performance and security of internet routing and mobile systems". She was named as an ACM Fellow, in the 2023 class of fellows, "for contributions to internet security and performance".
