= World Congress on Intelligent Transport Systems =

Annual conference and trade show

The World Congress on Intelligent Transport Systems (commonly known as the ITS World Congress) is an annual conference and trade show to promote ITS technologies. ERTICO (ITS Europe), ITS America, ITS AsiaPacific and ITS Japan are its sponsors. Each year the event takes place in a different region (Europe, Americas or Asia-Pacific).

Intelligent transportation systems (ITS) are advanced applications which, without embodying intelligence as such, aim to provide innovative services relating to different modes of transport and traffic management and enable various users to be better informed and make safer, more coordinated, and 'smarter' use of transport networks. They are considered a part of the Internet of things.

== History ==
The first ITS World Congress was held in 1994 in Paris, followed by the 2nd in Yokohama in 1995, and the 3rd in Orlando in 1996. The rotation of the venue location among the regions of the world continued:

- 1997: 4th, Berlin
- 1998: 5th, Seoul
- 1999: 6th, Toronto
- 2000: 7th, Turin
- 2001: 8th, Sydney
- 2002: 9th, Chicago
- 2003: 10th, Madrid
- 2004: 11th, Nagoya
- 2005: 12th, San Francisco
- 2006: 13th, London
- 2007: 14th, Beijing
- 2008: 15th, New York City
- 2009: 16th, Stockholm
- 2010: 17th, Busan
- 2011: 18th, Orlando
- 2012: 19th, Vienna
- 2013: 20th, Tokyo
- 2014: 21st, Detroit
- 2015: 22nd, Bordeaux
- 2016: 23rd, Melbourne
- 2017: 24th, Montreal
- 2018: 25th, Copenhagen
- 2019: 26th, Singapore
- 2020: Los Angeles virtual
- 2021: 27th, Hamburg
- 2022: 28th, Los Angeles
- 2023: 29th, Suzhou
- 2024: 30th, Dubai
- 2025: 31st, Atlanta
- 2026: 32nd, Gangneung

ITS World Congress Post Congress Reports are archived by ITS Japan.

== Future locations ==
- 2027: 33rd, Birmingham
- 2028: 34th, Orlando
- 2029: 35th, Taipei
