= Christos Kozyrakis =

Greek computer scientist

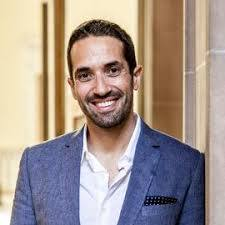
- Born: 1974 (age 51–52)
- Education: University of Crete; University of California, Berkeley
- Awards: Harry H. Goode Memorial Award (2026); ACM SIGARCH Maurice Wilkes Award (2015); IEEE Fellow; ACM Fellow
- Scientific career
- Fields: Computer architecture, computer systems
- Workplaces: Stanford University; Nvidia; École Polytechnique Fédérale de Lausanne
- Thesis: Scalable Vector Media-processors for Embedded Systems (2002)
- Doctoral advisor: David A. Patterson

Christos Kozyrakis (also Christoforos Kozyrakis; born 1974) is a Greek computer scientist whose research is in computer architecture and computer systems. He is the Leonard Bosack and Sandy K. Lerner Professor of Engineering and a professor of electrical engineering and computer science at Stanford University, and a researcher at Nvidia.

Kozyrakis has worked on transactional memory systems, energy-efficient computing, memory systems, and resource-efficient cloud computing. He received the ACM SIGARCH Maurice Wilkes Award in 2015 for contributions to transactional memory systems and the IEEE Computer Society Harry H. Goode Memorial Award in 2026.

== Education and career ==
Kozyrakis received a bachelor's degree from the University of Crete and began research in computer architecture at the Institute of Computer Science of the Foundation for Research & Technology – Hellas (ICS-FORTH), working in the Computer Architecture and VLSI Systems laboratory led by Manolis Katevenis. He received a Ph.D. in computer science from the University of California, Berkeley, where his doctoral work was part of the Berkeley IRAM project. His doctoral advisor was David A. Patterson, and his dissertation was titled Scalable Vector Media-processors for Embedded Systems.

He joined Stanford University in 2002 after completing his doctorate. In 2015, he spent a year at École Polytechnique Fédérale de Lausanne as a professor of computer science and communication systems. He has also held industry research roles and is a researcher at Nvidia.

== Research ==
Kozyrakis's research has addressed hardware and software techniques for parallel systems, transactional memory, memory systems, cloud resource management, and systems for artificial intelligence. His doctoral work in the Berkeley IRAM project studied processor-memory integration and vector processors for embedded systems, including architectures that integrated processing with memory and used wide vector execution.

In cloud computing, Kozyrakis and his collaborators developed resource-management techniques for datacenter workloads, including Paragon and Quasar, which used machine-learning methods to classify applications and manage resources in heterogeneous clusters. The New York Times covered this work in 2014 in an article on making cloud-computing systems more efficient. Recent work on AI infrastructure includes SGLang, a system for programming and executing structured language-model applications.

== Awards and honors ==
- Kozyrakis received the IEEE Computer Society Harry H. Goode Memorial Award in 2026.
- He received the ACM SIGARCH Maurice Wilkes Award in 2015 for "outstanding contributions to transactional memory systems".
- He is a Fellow of the Association for Computing Machinery and a Fellow of the Institute of Electrical and Electronics Engineers.
- His paper "Transactional Memory Coherence and Consistency" received the 2019 ACM SIGARCH/IEEE-CS TCCA Influential ISCA Paper Award,
- "Paragon: QoS-Aware Scheduling for Heterogeneous Datacenters" received the 2024 ACM SIGARCH/SIGPLAN/SIGOPS ASPLOS Influential Paper Award,
- "Evaluating MapReduce for Multi-core and Multiprocessor Systems" received the 2026 HPCA Test of Time Award.

== Selected publications ==
- Kozyrakis, Christoforos E.; Patterson, David A. (2003). "Scalable Vector Processors for Embedded Systems". IEEE Micro. 23 (6): 36–45. doi:10.1109/MM.2003.1261382.
- Hammond, Lance; Wong, Vicky; Chen, Mike; Carlstrom, Brian D.; Davis, John D.; Hertzberg, Ben; Prabhu, Manohar K.; Wijaya, Honggo; Kozyrakis, Christos; Olukotun, Kunle (2004). "Transactional Memory Coherence and Consistency". Proceedings of the 31st Annual International Symposium on Computer Architecture. pp. 102–113. doi:10.1109/ISCA.2004.1310767.
- Delimitrou, Christina; Kozyrakis, Christos (2013). "Paragon: QoS-aware scheduling for heterogeneous datacenters". Proceedings of the Eighteenth International Conference on Architectural Support for Programming Languages and Operating Systems. pp. 77–88. doi:10.1145/2451116.2451125.
- Delimitrou, Christina; Kozyrakis, Christos (2014). "Quasar: resource-efficient and QoS-aware cluster management". Proceedings of the Nineteenth International Conference on Architectural Support for Programming Languages and Operating Systems. pp. 127–144. doi:10.1145/2541940.2541941.
- Belay, Adam; Prekas, George; Klimovic, Ana; Grossman, Samuel; Kozyrakis, Christos; Bugnion, Edouard (2014). "IX: A Protected Dataplane Operating System for High Throughput and Low Latency". 11th USENIX Symposium on Operating Systems Design and Implementation (OSDI 14). USENIX Association. pp. 49–65.
- Zheng, Lianmin; Yin, Liangsheng; Xie, Zhiqiang; Sun, Chuyue; Huang, Jeff; Yu, Cody Hao; Cao, Shiyi; Kozyrakis, Christos; Stoica, Ion; Gonzalez, Joseph E.; Barrett, Clark; Sheng, Ying (2024). "SGLang: Efficient Execution of Structured Language Model Programs". Advances in Neural Information Processing Systems 37. arXiv:2312.07104. doi:10.52202/079017-2000.
