= Garth Gibson =

Canadian computer researcher

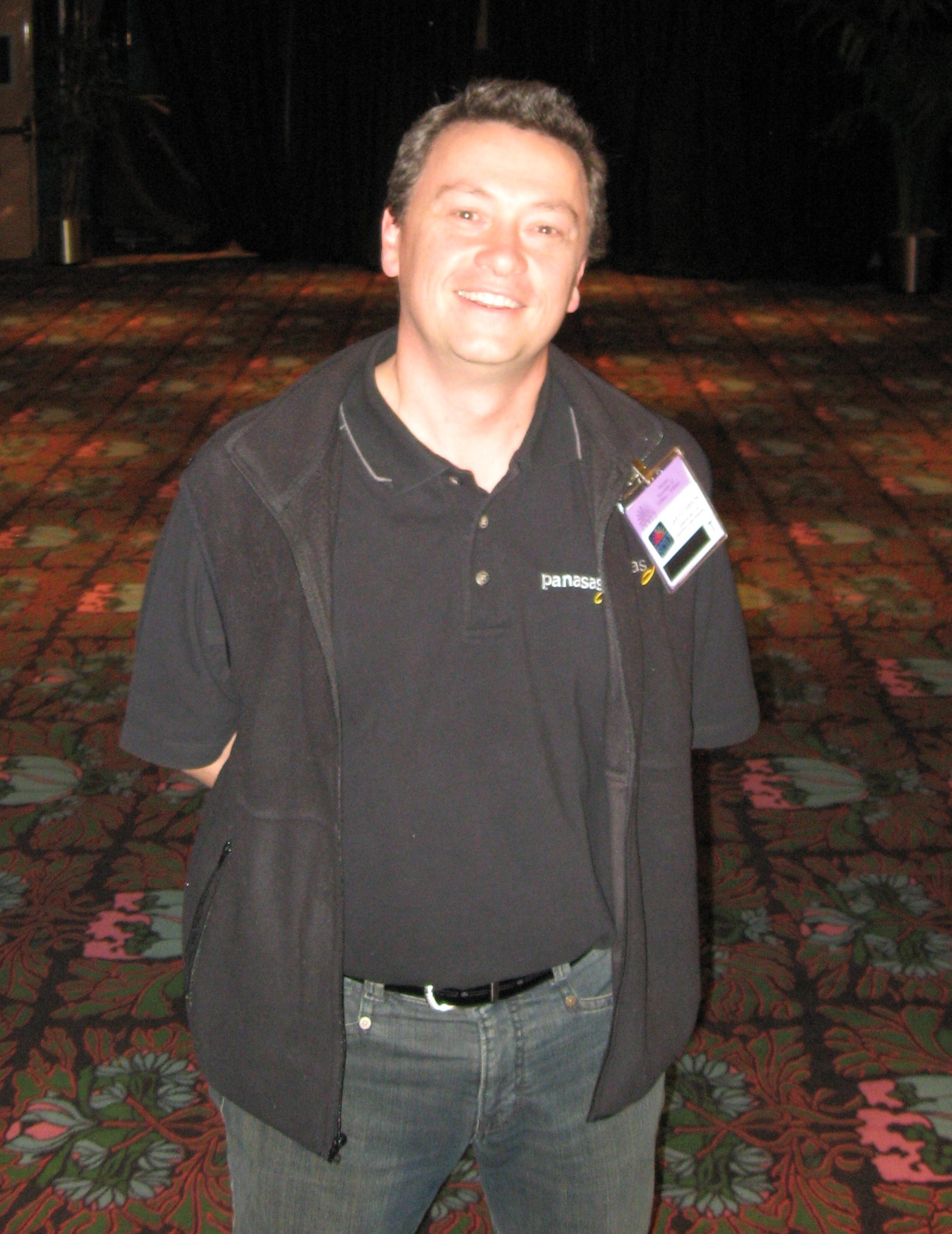
- Garth Gibson at Supercomputing 2007
- Born: Aurora, Ontario
- Education: University of Waterloo (BMath); University of California, Berkeley (MS, PhD)
- Known for: RAID
- Scientific career
- Fields: Computer science
- Workplaces: Vector Institute; Carnegie Mellon University
- Doctoral advisor: David A. Patterson; Randy Katz

Garth Alan Gibson is a computer scientist from Carnegie Mellon University. Gibson developed the RAID taxonomy of redundant data storage systems, along with David A. Patterson and Randy Katz.

== Biography ==
Born in Aurora, Ontario, he holds a Ph.D. and a M.S. in computer science from the University of California, Berkeley, and a B.Math in computer science from the University of Waterloo. He was involved in informed prefetch computing and network-attached secure disks, a precursor to the SCSI object storage device command set. Gibson was the initial director of the Parallel Data Laboratory at Carnegie Mellon University, and founder and chief technology officer for Panasas, a computer data storage hardware and software company. Gibson was the first president and chief executive officer of the Vector Institute.

In 2005 he became the 11th awardee of the J.W. Graham Medal, named in honor of Wes Graham, an early influential professor of computer science at the University of Waterloo, and annually awarded to an alumnus of the university's Faculty of Mathematics.

== See also ==
- List of University of Waterloo people
