= ITS America =

Intelligent transport systems lobby organization

Intelligent Transportation Society of America
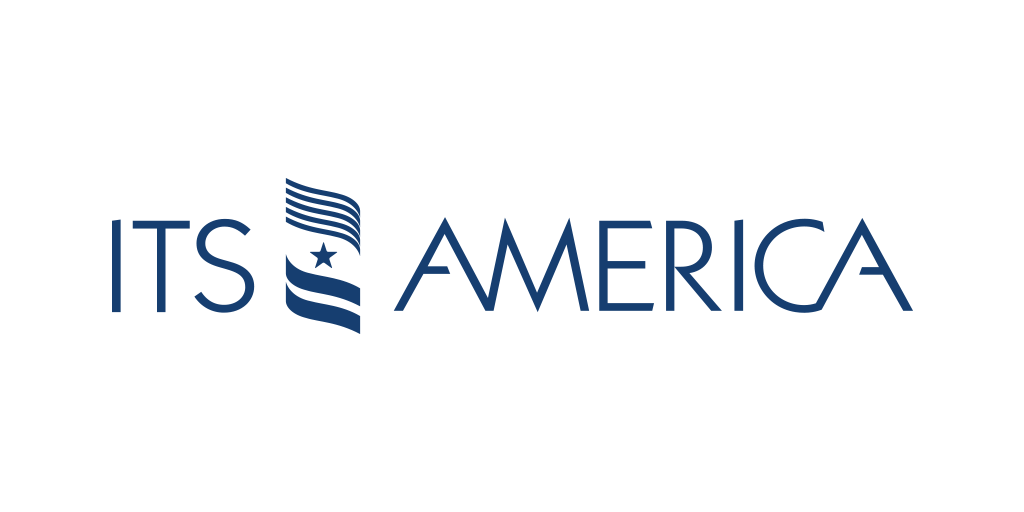
- Abbreviation: ITS America
- Formation: 1991
- Type: Non-governmental organization
- Purpose: Promoting research and deployment of intelligent transportation systems
- Headquarters: 1100 New Jersey Ave. SE; Suite 850; Washington, DC 20003
- Region served: United States
- President and CEO: Laura D. Chace
- Website: www.itsa.org

The Intelligent Transportation Society of America (ITS America) is a Washington, D.C.-based membership and advocacy group for the development and deployment of intelligent transportation systems (ITS) in the United States. ITS America was established in 1991 as a not-for-profit organization.

ITS America membership is composed of state and city public agencies, private companies, research institutions, and academia and includes automakers; telecommunications, traditional IT, emerging technology, consumer apps, industrial electronics, road, transit, and other transportation infrastructure operators; and the research community.

The organization is one of the participants of, and has hosted, the World Congress on Intelligent Transport Systems, an annual conference and trade show.

Laura D. Chace has been president and CEO of ITS since 2021.

== See also ==
- Internet of Things
- List of ITS associations
