= Randy Katz =

American computer scientist

Randy H. Katz
- Born: 1955 (age 70–71); New York City, U.S.
- Education: Cornell University (BA); University of California, Berkeley (MS, PhD)
- Scientific career
- Fields: Computer science
- Workplaces: University of California, Berkeley
- Thesis: Database Design and Translation for Multiple Data Models (1980)
- Doctoral advisor: Eugene Wong
- Doctoral students: Hari Balakrishnan; Gaetano Borriello; Chen-Nee Chuah; Susan J. Eggers; Z. Morley Mao; Venkata Padmanabhan; Srinivasan Seshan
- Website: people.cs.berkeley.edu/~randy/

Randy Howard Katz (born 1955) is an American computer scientist. He is a distinguished professor emeritus at University of California, Berkeley of the electrical engineering and computer science department.

== Biography ==
Katz was born in Brooklyn, New York in 1955. He was first exposed to computers in Canarsie High School. After graduating in 1973, Katz received an A.B. from Cornell University (May 1976), where he was a Cornell College Scholar majoring in computer science and mathematics, an M.S. from UC Berkeley (June 1978), under the direction of Larry Rowe, and a Ph.D., from UC Berkeley (June 1980), under the direction of Eugene Wong. He was a member of the Ingres Project.

After working at BBN and CCA in Cambridge, Massachusetts, Katz was an assistant professor in the Computer Sciences Department at the University of Wisconsin-Madison from 1981 to 1983. In 1983, he joined the Electrical Engineering and Computer Science Department at the University of California, Berkeley. He was promoted to associate professor in 1985 and full professor in 1988. He was appointed the United Microelectronics Corporation Distinguished Professor in EECS in 1996. From 1996 to 1999, he served as chair of the EECS Department, the first computer scientist to do so. In 2015, he served as chair of the Department's Computer Science Division. In 2018, he was appointed Berkeley's vice chancellor for research. He retired from the university in December 2021.

Katz is a fellow of the Association for Computing Machinery (ACM), Institute of Electrical and Electronics Engineers (IEEE) for contributions to computer system design, engineering education, and government service, the American Academy of Arts and Sciences (AAAS), and the American Association for the Advancement of Science (AAAS). He is also a member of the National Academy of Engineering (2000) for "contributions to high-performance input/output systems, engineering education, and government service".

He has published over 350 refereed technical papers, book chapters, and books. His textbook, Contemporary Logic Design, has sold over 85,000 copies, and has been used at over 200 colleges and universities. His academic recognitions include the Computer Science Division's Diane S. McEntyre Award for Excellence in Teaching Award, the Jim and Donna Gray Faculty Award for Excellence in Undergraduate Teaching, the Berkeley Academic Senate Distinguished Teaching Award, the ASEE Frederic E. Terman Award, the IEEE James H. Mulligan Jr. Education Medal, the ACM Karl V. Karlstrom Outstanding Educator Award, the ACM Sigmobile Outstanding Contributor Award, the IEEE Reynolds Johnson Information Storage Award, the Outstanding Alumni Award of the Computer Science Division, the CRA Distinguished Service Award, the United States Department of the Air Force Decoration for Exceptional Civilian Service, and the Pingat Bakti Masyarakat of the Government of Singapore.

Katz, along with David A. Patterson and Garth Gibson, developed the redundant array of inexpensive disks (RAID) concept for computer storage in their 1988 SIGMOD Conference paper. He also led the effort to connect the White House to the Internet in 1994.

== Books ==
- Contemporary Logic Design – Randy H. Katz. Addison-Wesley/Benjamin-Cummings, first edition (1993). ISBN 978-0201308570.

A widely used undergraduate textbook covering the principles of digital logic design, incorporating modern CAD tools and practical case studies.

- Contemporary Logic Design, Second Edition – Randy H. Katz and Gaetano Borriello. Pearson/Addison-Wesley (2005). ISBN 978-0131278301.

An updated edition of the foundational text, featuring expanded content on programmable logic, hardware description languages, and system design methodologies.

== Award Publications ==
- C. Reiss; A. Tumanov; G. R. Ganger; R. H. Katz; M. A. Kozuch. Heterogeneity and Dynamicity of Clouds at Scale: the Google Trace. ACM Symposium on Cloud Computing (SoCC), San Jose, CA, (October 2012). 2021 SOCC “Test of Time” Award. doi:10.1145/2391229.2391236.
- B. Hindman; A. Konwinski; M. Zaharia; A. Ghodsi; A. D. Joseph; R. H. Katz; I. Stoica; S. Shenker. Mesos: A Platform for Fine-Grained Resource Sharing in the Data Center (PDF). 8th USENIX Symposium on Networked Systems Design and Implementation, Boston, MA, (March 2011). pp. 295–308. 2021 NSDI “Test of Time” Award.
- R. Fonseca; G. Porter; R. H. Katz; S. Shenker; I. Stoica. X-Trace: A Pervasive Network Tracing Framework (PDF). Fourth USENIX Symposium on Networked Systems Design and Implementation (NSDI 2007), Cambridge, MA, (April 2007). pp. 271–284. 2017 NSDI “Test of Time” Award.
- S. Alspaugh; B. Chen; J. Lin; A. Ganapathi; M. Hearst; R. H. Katz. Analyzing Log Analysis: An Empirical Study of User Log Mining (PDF). USENIX Large Installation System Administration (LISA) Conference, Seattle, WA, (November 2014). pp. 53–68. Best Student Paper Award.
- A. Rabkin; R. H. Katz. Precomputing Possible Configuration Error Diagnoses. IEEE/ACM International Conference on Automated Software Engineering (ASE 2011), Lawrence, KS, (November 2011). pp. 193–202. ACM SIGSOFT Distinguished Paper Award. doi:10.1109/ASE.2011.6100053.
- A. Ganapathi; Y. Chen; A. Fox; R. H. Katz; D. Patterson. Statistics-Driven Workload Modeling for the Cloud (PDF). 5th International Workshop on Self-Managing Database Systems, Long Beach, CA, (March 2010). pp. 87–92. Best Paper Award.
- Gunho Lee; N. Tolia; P. Ranganathan; R. H. Katz. Topology-Aware Resource Allocation for Data-Intensive Workloads. 1st ACM Asia-Pacific Workshop on Systems (APSys ‘2010), New Delhi, India, (August 2010). pp. 120–124. Best Workshop Paper Award. doi:10.1145/1851276.1851278.
- F. Yu; T. V. Lakshman; R. H. Katz. Gigabit Rate Pattern-Matching using TCAM. International Conference on Network Protocols (ICNP), Berlin, Germany, (October 2004). pp. 174–183. Best Paper Award.
- F. Yu; R. H. Katz. Efficient Multi-class Classification using TCAM. Hot Interconnects: 12th Symposium on High Performance Interconnects, Stanford, CA, (August 2004). pp. 28–34. Best Paper Award. doi:10.1109/CONECT.2004.1375197.
- L. Subramanian; V. Roth; I. Stoica; R. H. Katz; S. Shenker. Listen and Whisper: Security Mechanisms for BGP. USENIX/ACM Symposium on Networked System Design and Implementation (NSDI’04), San Francisco, CA, (March 2004). pp. 127–140. Best Student Paper.
- Z. Mao; R. H. Katz. A Framework for Universal Service Access using Device Ensembles. CRA Grace Murray Hopper Celebration of Women in Computer Science Conference, Vancouver, BC, (October 2002). pp. 10–15. Best Student Paper Award. CiteSeerX 10.1.1.57.8669.
- S. D. Gribble; M. Welsh; R. von Behren; E. A. Brewer; D. Culler; N. Borisov; S. Czerwinski; R. Gummadi; J. Hill; A. Joseph; R. H. Katz; Z. M. Mao; S. Ross; B. Zhao (2001). "The Ninja Architecture for Robust Internet-Scale Systems and Services". Journal of Computer Networks. 35 (4): 473–497. doi:10.1016/S1389-1286(00)00179-1.
- E. Amir; S. McCanne; R. H. Katz. An Active Service Framework and its Application to Real-time Multimedia Transcoding. ACM SIGCOMM’98 Conference, Vancouver, Canada, 1998. pp. 178–189. Best Paper Award. doi:10.1145/285237.285281.
- E. Amir; S. McCanne; R. H. Katz. Receiver-driven Bandwidth Adaptation for Light-weight Sessions. ACM Multimedia Conference, Seattle, WA, 1997. pp. 415–426. Best Paper Award. doi:10.1145/266180.266395.
- R. Ranjan; S. Qadeer; A. Mehrotra; R. H. Katz. Benchmarking Architectures for CAD. IEEE International Conference on Computer Design (ICCD ‘97) Conference, Austin, TX, (October 1997). pp. 670–675. Best Paper Award.
- T. Hodes; R. H. Katz; E. Servan-Schreiber; L. A. Rowe. Composable Ad-Hoc Mobile Services for Universal Interaction. Third ACM Mobicom Conference, Budapest, Hungary, (September 1997). pp. 1–12. Best Paper Award. doi:10.1145/262116.
- H. Balakrishnan; S. Seshan; E. Amir; R. H. Katz. Improving TCP/IP Performance over Wireless Networks. ACM Conference on Mobile Computing and Networks, Oakland, CA, (November 1995). pp. 2–11. Best Paper Award. doi:10.1145/215530.215544.
- R. H. Katz; D. Gordon; J. A. Tuttle. Storage System Metrics for Evaluating Disk Array Organizations. Proceedings of U. S. Decus Symposia, Atlanta, GA, (May 1991). pp. 20. Best Paper Award.
- David Patterson; Garth A. Gibson; Randy H. Katz (1988). A Case for Redundant Arrays of Inexpensive Disks (RAID) (PDF). SIGMOD Conference. pp. 109–116. 2012 Jean-Claude Laprie Award in Dependable Computing. ACM SIGOPS 2011 “Hall of Fame Paper Award.” ACM SIGMOD 1998 "Test of Time" Award.
- Katz, R. H.; M. Anwarrudin; E. Chang. A Version Server for Computer-Aided Design Data. Proceedings 23rd ACM/IEEE Design Automation Conference, Las Vegas, NV, (June 1986). pp. 27–33. Best Paper Award.
