= Kimberly Keeton =

American computer scientist

Kimberly Kristine Keeton is an American computer scientist specializing in databases and computer data storage. She worked at HP Labs as a Distinguished Technologist and is currently employed by Google as Principal Engineer, and was one of the designers of the Express Query metadata database used by Hewlett-Packard as part of their StoreAll large-scale data storage systems.

== Education ==
Keeton did her undergraduate studies at Carnegie Mellon University, with a double major in computer engineering and in engineering and public policy. She completed her Ph.D. in 1999 at the University of California, Berkeley. Her dissertation, Computer Architecture Support for Database Applications, was supervised by David Patterson.

== Recognition ==
A paper written by Keeton in 2004 with four other researchers on the automated design of disaster-resistant enterprise storage systems won the Usenix FAST Test of Time Award in 2018. She also won the 2018 SIGMOD best paper award for her work with other collaborators on "range filtering" data structures that combine the memory-efficient filtering abilities of bloom filters with the ability of range query data structures to find data with a range of key values rather than with a single exactly matching key.

Keeton was elected as an ACM Fellow in 2018 for "contributions to improving the dependability, manageability, and usability of storage and novel memory". She became an IEEE Fellow in 2021.
