= Srinivasan Seshan =

American computer scientist

Srinivasan "Srini" Seshan is an American computer scientist and a professor of computer science at Carnegie Mellon University, specializing in computer networks.

== Education and career ==
Seshan's bachelor's degree, master's degree, and Ph.D. are all from the University of California, Berkeley, in 1990, 1993, and 1995. His thesis, Low Latency Handoff in Mobile Networks, was supervised by Randy Katz. After graduating, he joined the Thomas J. Watson Research Center where he was a research staff member until 2000, when he joined the CMU faculty. At CMU, he was Finmeccanica Associate Professor from 2004 to 2006. He is currently a Full Professor and was the Associate Department Head at the Computer Science Department at CMU from 2011 to 2015. It was announced in March, 2018 that Frank Pfenning would be stepping down as department head and Seshan would be taking over, effective July 1, 2018.

== Interests ==
His main research interests lie in the broad fields of distributed network applications and network protocols. Seshan has previously worked on issues like transport and routing protocol interactions with wireless networks, sensor networking, rapid protocol stack implementations, RAID system design, performance prediction for internet transfers, firewall design, and TCP protocol improvements.

Examples of Seshan's research include the two projects:

- Next Generation Network Architectures
- Wireless Networks and Mobile Systems

== Recognition ==
He was elected as an ACM Fellow in 2019 "for contributions to computer networking, mobile computing and wireless communications".
