= ZMW attack =

The ZMW attack is a hypothetical denial-of-service attack on the Internet's routing infrastructure, named after Ying Zhang, Z. Morley Mao, and Jia Wang, the researchers who published the original paper that considered its possibility.

It relies on using targeted denial-of-service attacks on links carrying BGP connections between Autonomous Systems, in an attempt to overwhelm routers in the Default-Free Zone with routing updates, leading to disruption through forcing them to perform continuous route recalculations.

In 2010, the security researcher Max Schuchard published a paper considering the possibility of using a botnet to perform a ZMW attack on the Internet's entire core infrastructure, hypothetically allowing a botnet of 250,000 computers to "crash" the entire Internet.

== See also ==
- Shrew attack
