= Microsoft India =

Division of Microsoft in India

Microsoft India Development Center (IDC)

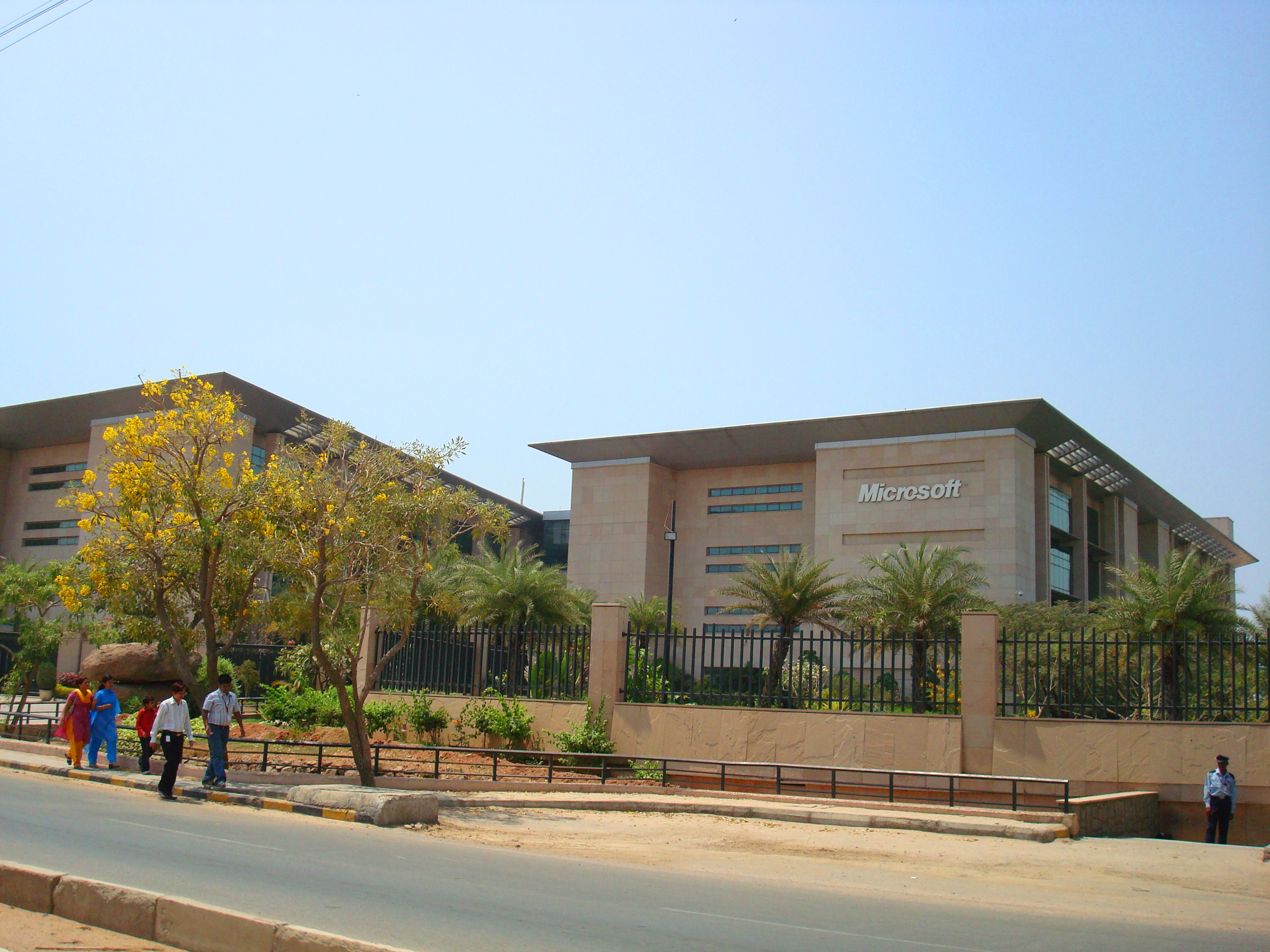
- Headquarters in Hyderabad
- Type: Subsidiary
- Industry: Computer software
- Founded: 1990
- Headquarters: Hyderabad, India
- Key people: Rajiv Kumar (MD, IDC)
- Number of employees: Over 18,000
- Parent: Microsoft Corporation
- Website: www.microsoft.com/en-in/msidc/

Microsoft India Development Center (IDC) is a subsidiary of American software company Microsoft Corporation, headquartered in Hyderabad, India. The company first entered the Indian market in 2002, and has since worked closely with the Indian government, the IT industry, academia and the local developer community to usher in some of the early successes in the IT market. Microsoft currently has offices in the 10 cities of Ahmedabad, Bengaluru, Chennai, Hyderabad, Kolkata, Mumbai, the NCR (New Delhi, Noida and Gurgaon) and Pune.

As of December 2022, Microsoft employed over 18,000 people in India, up from 8,000 in 2020. and has six business units representing the complete Microsoft product portfolio.

== Microsoft India Development Center ==
Located in Hyderabad, the Microsoft India Development Center (MSIDC) is Microsoft's first foreign research and development centre outside the US and largest software development center outside of their headquarters in Redmond, Washington. The establishment of the centre followed a 1998 meeting between the then Chief Minister of Andra Pradesh N. Chandrababu Naidu, and Microsoft's founder Bill Gates at an event in New Delhi.

The MSIDC teams focus on strategic and IP sensitive software product development.

== Business units ==
Microsoft India operates the following six business units in India.

1. Microsoft India (R&D) Private Limited
2. Microsoft Research India (MSR India)
3. Microsoft Services Global Delivery (MSGD)
4. Microsoft Corporation India Pvt. Ltd. (MCIPL)
5. Microsoft IT India (MSIT India)
6. Microsoft India Global Technical Support Center (IGTSC)
