= Nericell =

Road traffic monitoring system

Nericell is a system which uses smartphones for monitoring traffic data. Nericell performs rich sensing by piggybacking on smartphones that users carry. It uses the accelerometer, radio, GPS, and microphone sensors found in these phones to detect potholes, bumps, braking, and honking. Nericell addresses several issues, including virtually reorienting the accelerometer on a phone that is in an arbitrary orientation, and performing honk detection and localization in an energy efficient manner.
