= Lorenzo Alvisi =

Italian computer scientist and professor

Lorenzo Alvisi is an Italian computer scientist and Tisch University Professor at Cornell University. Prior to joining Cornell, he was a University Distinguished Teaching Professor and the holder of the Endowed Professorship #5 at the University of Texas at Austin. His research focuses on distributed systems and dependability. He holds a laurea in Physics from the University of Bologna (1987), and an MS and PhD in computer science from Cornell University (1994 and 1996, respectively). He is a fellow of the Association for Computing Machinery since 2010 and of the Institute of Electrical and Electronics Engineers since 2016.

In May 2024, Alvisi was named the chair of Cornell's Department of Computer Science.
