= Geotab =

Canadian technology company

Geotab Inc.
- Type: Private
- Industry: Telematics
- Founded: 2000
- Headquarters: Oakville, Ontario
- Area served: North America, Latin America, Europe, Australia, Asia, Africa
- Key people: Neil Cawse (CEO)
- Website: www.geotab.com

Geotab is a Canadian technology company that develops and manufactures telematics and fleet management solutions. It provides hardware devices for automatic vehicle location, including GPS tracking units, and a cloud-based software platform called MyGeotab, which includes services in fleet digitalization and asset tracking. The company has over 4 million connected vehicles on its platform.

Geotab is the largest fleet telematics provider in both Europe and Latin America by number of active subscriptions. The company's platform is used by businesses and public sector organizations.

Geotab is privately owned by CEO Neil Cawse, without outside investors.

== History ==
Geotab was founded in 2000 by Neil Cawse and his siblings in Oakville, Ontario.

In 2012, the company launched MyGeotab, its flagship fleet management software. That same year, it partnered with Sprint to facilitate expansion within the US market.

The company acquired Strategic Telecom Solutions in 2015, the electric vehicle telematics provider FleetCarma in 2018, Spanish engineering firm Intendia in 2018, and BSM Technologies in 2019.

In 2021, Geotab launched a business unit called Altitude by Geotab (formerly Geotab ITS), which provides transportation data analytics for public and commercial sector projects. The unit has published studies on topics including urban freight efficiency, trucking electrification, and the use of fleet data by fuel retailers. The service uses aggregated and anonymized data to protect the privacy of its customers and their customers.

Geotab has received several large government contracts related to fleet digitalization. In 2017, the company was awarded a blanket purchase agreement by the U.S. Department of Homeland Security, and in 2020, it won a sole-source contract to equip 21,000 vehicles for the U.S. Air Force with its fleet telematics system.

In 2021, Geotab paid a penalty of $438,750 in a settlement with the California Air Resources Board (CARB) for selling non-compliant aftermarket telematics control units in California.

In 2022, the U.S. Court of Federal Claims upheld Geotab's contract with the U.S. Postal Service, valued at up to $301 million, after competitor Samsara filed a bid protest challenging the award.

In 2025, Geotab acquired European and Australian commercial operations for the telematics business of Verizon Connect. That year, Geotab also started offering the Geotab CEO Visionary Award, an annual $25,000 donation recognizing companies that significantly impact the connected vehicle industry. The first winner was Rollins, Inc.

== Recognition ==
In 2019, the company was included in Deloitte's Technology Fast 500 list in North America.

In 2023, it received the “Best Commercial Vehicle Innovator” award from Canadian Business magazine.
