= LoJack =

Device for tracking stolen vehicles

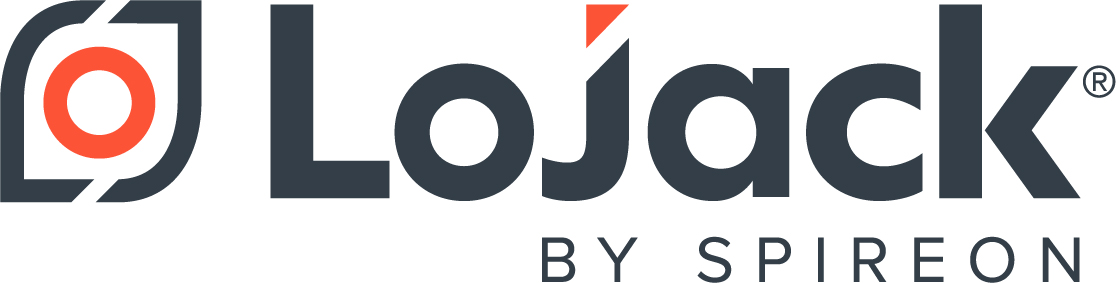
- Type: Connected car technology with stolen vehicle recovery system
- Inventor: William Reagan
- Inception: 1986
- Manufacturer: Spireon
- Available: Yes
- Website: lojack.com

LoJack is a stolen vehicle recovery and IoT-connected car system that uses GPS and cellular technology to locate users' vehicles, view trip history, see battery levels, and support automatic vehicle location, asset tracking, and speeding alerts as part of a fleet telematics system used in fleet management. Prior to selling a vehicle, LoJack dealers can use the system to track and trace inventory, view and manage battery health, and recover stolen vehicles.

Previous generations of the system used radio tracking signals via a hidden, mounted transceiver and a tracking computer installed in police cars and aircraft.

== History ==
The original LoJack system was created and patented in 1979 by William Reagan, a former police commissioner of Medfield, Massachusetts, who went on to establish LoJack Corporation in Medfield. Reagan served as the company's first CEO and chairman. The name "LoJack" was coined to be the antithesis of "hijack", wherein "hijack" refers to the theft of a vehicle through force.

== Legacy radio-based system ==
The original LoJack was a radio-based, hardware tracking system designed to prevent the theft of a vehicle and aid in stolen vehicle recovery by transmitting vehicle location data to the LoJack receiver.

It was installed in the vehicle and connected to the starting mechanism such that only the original key would turn on the vehicle. It could also include the incorporation of a scheme whereby an additional step was required to activate the ignition. Prior to starting, it would require the activation of any number of the usual vehicle features such as the radio, headlight switch, or other switched device.

The core of the legacy LoJack system is a small, silent radio transceiver that is discreetly installed in a vehicle. Once installed, the unit and the vehicle's VIN are registered in a database that interfaces with the National Crime Information Center (NCIC) system used by federal, state, and local law enforcement agencies throughout the United States. In the event of a theft, a customer reports the incident to the police, who will make a routine entry into the state police crime computer, including the stolen vehicle's VIN. This theft report is automatically processed by LoJack network computers, triggering a remote command to the specific LoJack unit in the stolen vehicle.

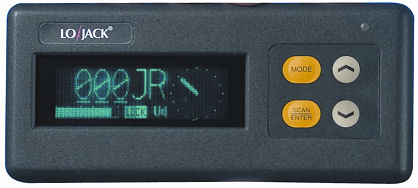
LoJack tracking computer

The command activates the LoJack unit to start sending out signals to LoJack police tracking computers onboard some police cars. Every police car that is equipped within a 3- to 5-mile radius of the signal source will be alerted. The tracking units will display an alphanumeric reply code and an indication of the approximate direction and distance to the stolen vehicle. Based on the reply code, the police can obtain a physical description of the vehicle, including make (brand), model, color, VIN, and license plate number. Police aircraft can also be equipped with tracking computers and airborne units can receive line-of-sight signals from further away than ground-based units. The signal is received in equipped police vehicles, using a phased-array antenna system, hence the four distinctive antennae on the roof. This provides the directional location tracking capabilities of the system.

In addition to motor vehicle theft recovery, LoJack systems are used to recover stolen construction equipment and motorcycles.

By 2013, the LoJack system was reportedly operating in 28 states and the District of Columbia and in more than 30 countries. The company reported that more than 1,800 U.S. law enforcement agencies had LoJack tracking computers in their police vehicles. In November 2013, the company announced it was expanding tracking capabilities to parents, automakers, and insurance companies.

In March 2016, the company was acquired for $134 million by CalAmp, an Irvine, California-based provider of internet of things software applications, cloud services, data intelligence, and telematics products.

In 2024, CalAmp filed for Chapter 11 bankruptcy, allowing for a secured deal with its lenders to swap its $229 million in bonds for equity. The company stated that its financial state has been bleak for many years, blaming its acquisition of LoJack and an ill-fated program that stretches customer's payment terms.

=== Frequency ===
LoJack transmits on a radio (RF) carrier frequency of 173.075 MHz. Vehicles with the system installed send a 200-millisecond (ms) chirp every 15 seconds on this frequency. When being tracked after having been reported as stolen, the devices send out a 200 ms signal once per second. The radio frequency transmitted by LoJack is near the VHF spectrum used in North America by digital television channel 7, although interference is said to be minimal due to the low power of radiation, brief chirp duration, and long interval between chirps.

== Modern system ==
The modern LoJack system, which has evolved as part of the broader trend of fleet digitalization, is a cellular- and GPS-based vehicle tracking system and telematics product. In modern deployments, it functions as a GPS tracking unit for location monitoring and stolen-vehicle recovery.

In March 2021, the vehicle intelligence company Spireon announced it had acquired the LoJack U.S. Stolen Vehicle Recovery business from CalAmp, joining LoJack users with "nearly 4 million active subscribers from over 20,000 current Spireon customers". CalAmp would still keep and continue to expand LoJack International, that operates as a subscription-based SaaS business, while retaining ownership of the LoJack patents and trademarks.

In 2023, a group of security researchers announced discovery of multiple software bugs affecting vehicles from nearly all major car brands, potentially enabling hackers to take full control of the affected cars. The most serious vulnerabilities were in Spireon's fleet management software, which spans 15 million connected vehicles, and could have allowed remote control over a wide range of fleet vehicles, including those used by law enforcement. All identified bugs have since been fixed.

== See also ==
- Carjacking
- Connected car
- Motor vehicle theft
- Radio direction finder
- Vehicle tracking system
