= Dashcam =

Onboard camera that records through vehicle windows

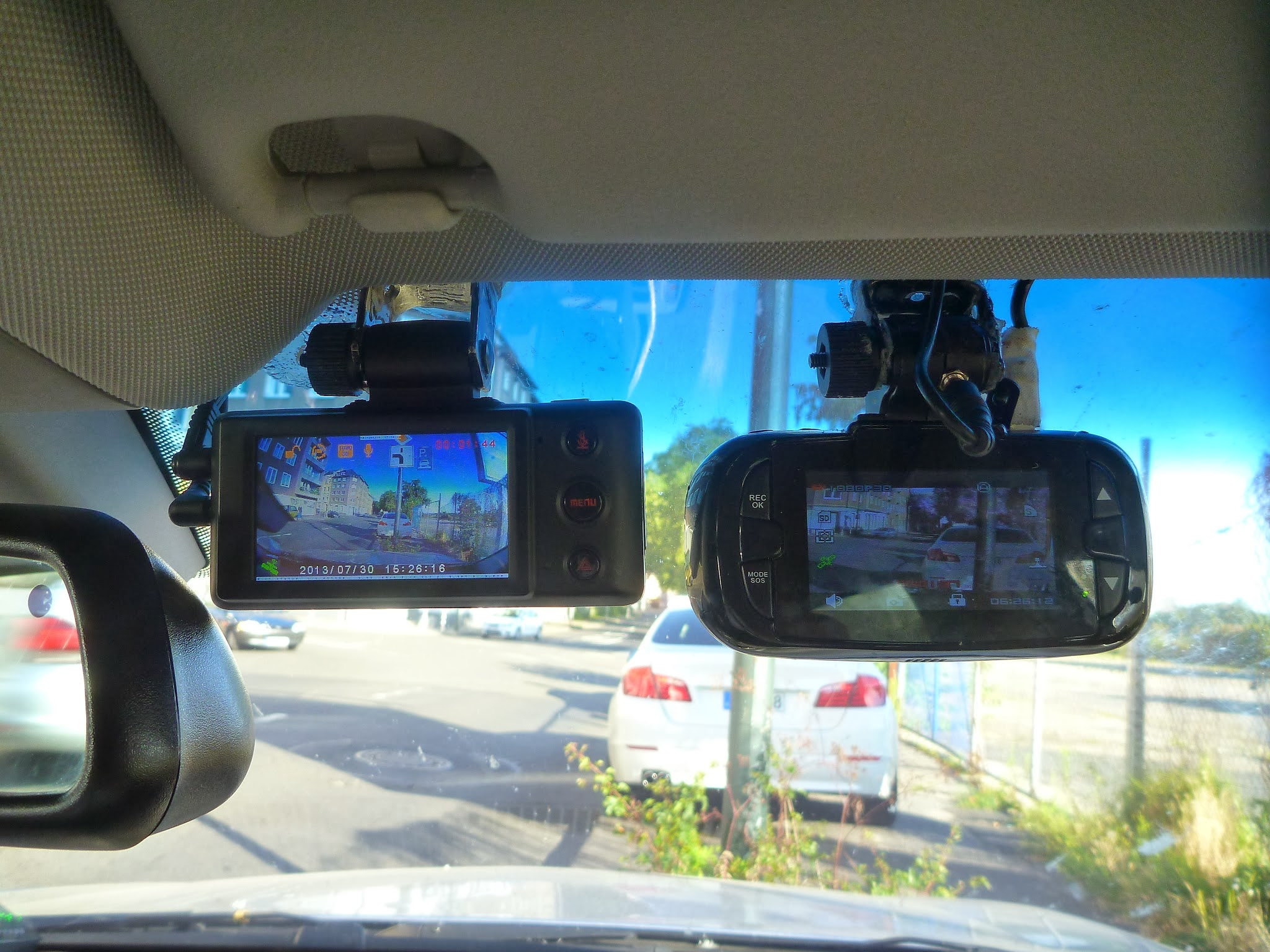
Two dashcams on a windshield

A dashboard camera or simply dashcam, also known as car digital video recorder (car DVR), driving recorder, or event data recorder (EDR), is an onboard camera that continuously records the view through a vehicle's front windscreen and sometimes rear or other windows. Some dashcams include a camera to record the interior of the car in 360 degrees inside camera, usually in a ball form, and can automatically send pictures and video using mobile connectivity. In commercial fleets, dashcams are a core component of video telematics systems, which are a key technology used in the broader trend of fleet digitalization and referred to as AI Dashcams.

EDRs and some dashcams record acceleration/deceleration g-force, speed, steering angle, GPS data, voltage of the power source (vehicle's electrical net), etc. A wide-angle 130, 170° or more front camera may be attached to the interior windscreen, to the rear-view mirror (clip on), or to the top of the dashboard, by suction cup or adhesive-tape mount. A rear camera is usually mounted in the rear window or in the registration plate, with an RCA video output to the display monitor/screen.

The resolution will determine the overall quality of the video. Full HD or 1080p (1920×1080) is standard for dash HD cams. Dash cameras may have 1080p, 1296p (common for Chinese dashcams), 1440p, or higher definition for a front camera and 720p for a back camera and include f/1.8 aperture and night vision mode.

== Types ==
By targeted field of view:

- exterior view such as for recording the front view only, the rear view, etc.
- cabin or inside viewing mode sometimes also called a taxicam

Some cabin cams include a screen that can be attached to the rear-view mirror employing usually rubber rings or straps or as a direct replacement of the rear view mirror itself. Others attach to the windshield, dash, or other suitable interior surfaces Many dashcams include rechargeable batteries not needed when connected to car battery wire or capacitors.

== Functions ==
To ensure that recorded video files are not tampered with once they have been recorded, videos can be timestamped in a tamper-proof manner, a procedure termed trusted timestamping. To ensure a reliable 24/7 parking surveillance when capacity is an issue, a motion detector may be used to record only when an approaching human/vehicle is detected, in order to save power and storage media.Advanced driver assistance system (ADAS) and park location save can be included.

== Technical Features ==
With the development of technology, dashcams have become more feature-rich, with further integration of detailed functionalities such as GPS location tracking, speed recording, Wi-Fi/Bluetooth transmission, cloud backup, smartphone app applications, and voice control, making them more intelligent.These features are common and competitive on Amazon.

== Commercial fleet applications ==
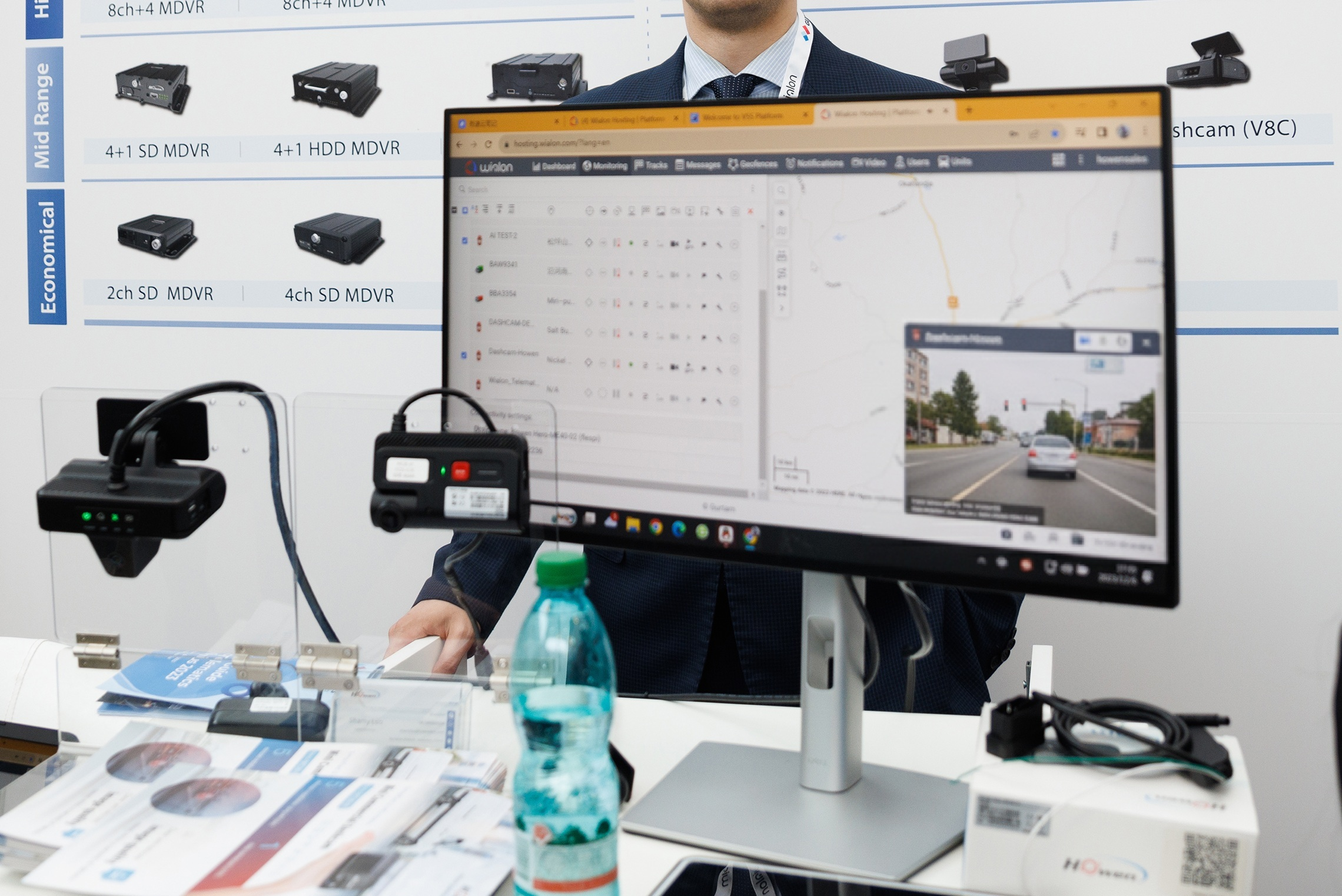
A display at a technology exhibition showcases a video telematics device and its accompanying software interface.

While popular with consumers for insurance and security purposes, dashcams are also used in commercial fleet management. Such dashcams have no screen and have an inbuilt GPS tracking unit and other sensors, and are called AI Dashcams. Thus, they become part of a vehicle tracking system, functioning as video telematics devices. These devices provide vehicle location data for automatic vehicle location. As part of a fleet digitalization strategy, these systems, often managed by fleet management software, are used for incident recording, stolen vehicle recovery, driver coaching and scoring, identifying risky behavior with AI, and improving operational safety and efficiency. Multi-camera systems connected to a central Mobile Digital Video Recorder (MDVR) are often used on larger vehicles like trucks and buses, contributing to a wider Intelligent transportation system.

== SD-cards, satellite and wireless ==
=== SD-cards ===
Dashcams usually use class 10 or above MicroSDHC or MicroSDXC cards usually 16 GB or higher or internal memory to save videos.

=== Satellite ===
The port to connect the GPS antenna can use a micro USB or 3.5 mm jack connection. The antenna is usually 1575 to 1568 MHz and 3.0 to 5.0 V. GPS coordinate stamping capability is included in most dashcams (some need an external GPS antenna, but other dashcam systems have built-in GPS), and others include GPS (online and offline) navigation.

=== Wireless connectivity ===
Some dashcams include Wi-Fi, Bluetooth, and 4G connectivity. This connectivity is fundamental to commercial video telematics, allowing for real-time event alerts, remote coaching, and live streaming from the vehicle to a central fleet management platform. For Bluetooth and voice commands and recording, a built-in microphone is included. 4G triple-cam (also called triple-lens and three-way-cams) sets on rearview mirror are becoming more available (2 front cameras - one 170° to mainly record road, one 360° for sides and doors and a rear camera). 4G is used to send messages, calls, pictures, and videos in parking surveillance mode. Usually a second 360° camera is employed to record the car's sides front doors and windows and inside. Moreover, 4G is used to send a message when the car battery is low.

== Hardwire ==
Dashcam units usually operate via the vehicle electrical system, converting the 13.8V to a 5V USB connector. Dashcams can be plugged in via the cigarette lighter socket, or may be hardwired directly into the electrical system, freeing up the power outlet for other uses. In order to store files and properly format the media card when power is turned off, dashcams use either a Lithium Polymer (LiPo) battery or a capacitor. While both provide power for a very short period of time, they have very different operating capabilities and limitations.

LiPo batteries have an estimated life of 2–3 years or roughly 300–500 cycles. Over time, the material inside the battery will start to degrade resulting in out-gassing. This can be observed in a swollen or puffy looking battery case. When a LiPo battery reaches this point, the battery is no longer able to hold a charge. The result is a camera that may randomly turn on or off, or register format errors if it can't shut down correctly when power is turned off since it can only function when using the power from the vehicle. Capacitors can also store a temporary charge and will last much longer. They are also more resistant to higher operating temperatures, but are more expensive and require additional hardware or software support. Generally the LiPo batteries are found in less expensive dashcams and capacitors are used in more expensive dashcams.

== Culture ==
Dashcam recording of the Chelyabinsk meteor

Dashcams are widespread in Russia as a guard against police corruption and insurance fraud, where they provide additional evidence. They have been called "ubiquitous" and "an on-line obsession", and are so prevalent that dashcam recordings were the most common videos of the February 2013 Chelyabinsk meteor, which was documented from at least a dozen angles. Videos showing automobile and aircraft crashes, close calls, and attempts at insurance fraud have been uploaded to social sharing websites such as YouTube, Facebook, Twitter, Yandex, and other websites.

In the United Kingdom, sales of dashcams rocketed in 2015, which was the fastest growing consumer electronic, with sales increasing by 395%. In China, dashcams were well-known by a dramatic event of a road rage. In the United States, it is reported that around 16% of drivers use dashcams with 20% of dash cam owners have used their footage for an insurance claim.

Dashcams have captured numerous aviation accidents, such as National Airlines Flight 102 in 2013, TransAsia Airways Flight 235 in 2015, the Shoreham Airshow crash in 2015. the catastrophic engine failure of United Airlines Flight 328 in 2021, and the crash of UPS Airlines Flight 2976 in 2025. Dashboard cameras have become the top feature wanted by future vehicle buyers, and more car manufacturers are incorporating built-in camera systems.

== Legality ==
While dashcams are gaining in popularity as a way of protection against distortion of facts, they also attract negative attitudes for privacy concerns. This is also reflected in the laws of different countries in different and conflicting ways:

- Austria prohibits their use if the main purpose is surveillance, which may carry fines of up to € 25,000. Other uses are legal, although the distinction can be difficult to make.
- In Switzerland, their use is strongly discouraged in public space as they may contravene data protection principles.
- In Germany, while small cameras for personal use in vehicles are allowed, posting footage from them on social-media sites is considered a violation of privacy and thus forbidden, if personal data is not blurred in the footage. In 2018, the Federal Court of Justice ruled that although the permanent recording of traffic events is inadmissible under national data protection law, the recordings made may nevertheless be used as evidence in civil proceedings after careful consideration of the interests involved. It can be assumed that this case law will also apply under the new basic European Data Protection Regulation.
- In Luxembourg, it is not illegal to possess a dashcam but it is illegal to use one to capture videos or still images in a public place which includes in a vehicle on a public road. Recording using a dashcam may result in a fine or imprisonment.
- In Australia, recording on public roadways is allowed as long as the recording does not infringe upon one's personal privacy in a way that may be deemed inappropriate in a court of law.
- In the United States, at the federal level, the video taping of public events is protected under the First Amendment. Videotaping of non-public events and videotaping-related issues, including sound recording and matters related to time of the day, venue, manner of recording, privacy concerns, implications on motor vehicle moving violation issues such as whether the windshield view is being blocked, are dealt with at the state level.
- In Russia, they are explicitly allowed by regulations issued in 2009 by the Ministry of the Interior. Courts almost always use the video recorder attached to the analysis of the accident as evidence of guilt or innocence of the driver.

== Police use ==
Police departments use dashcams in police vehicles to gather evidence during traffic stops and car chases. Some dashcam systems can be automatically activated when a police car's emergency lights or siren are turned on. Freedom of information laws mean that the footage can be released under some circumstances, and this can be an important tool in reporting on police actions. TV shows like World's Wildest Police Videos have frequently featured car chase videos shot from dashcams. Some police officers accused of police brutality or misconduct tamper with their cameras to disable audio or video recording. A report in 2016 showed that in Chicago, 80% of the police dashcams did not work properly. Among the causes were that officers destroyed antennas, hid microphones, and removed batteries or recording media.

== See also ==
- Android Auto
- Anthony Graber
- Glik v. Cunniffe
- IP camera
- List of auto parts
- Video telematics
- Fleet digitalization
- Wide dynamic range (WDR)
