= Samsara (company) =

American technology company

Samsara Inc.
- Type: Public
- Traded as: NYSE: IOT (Class A); Russell 1000 component
- Industry: Internet of things, Fleet management, Video telematics
- Founded: 2015; 11 years ago
- Founders: Sanjit Biswas; John Bicket
- Headquarters: San Francisco, California, United States
- Key people: Sanjit Biswas; (Chairman & CEO); John Bicket; (CTO)
- Revenue: ▲US$937 million (2024)
- Operating income: ▲US$−249 million (2024)
- Net income: ▲US$−286 million (2024)
- Total assets: ▲US$1.73 billion (2024)
- Total equity: ▼US$915 million (2024)
- Number of employees: 3,500 (2025)
- Website: samsara.com
- Footnotes; Financials as of January 31, 2024

Samsara Inc. is an American IoT company headquartered in San Francisco, California, that provides telematics software and insights for physical operations. The company has customers across North America and Europe. Samsara developed a connected operations cloud platform that provides insights to physical operations organizations in the transportation, construction, energy, utilities, public sector and retail industries, and supports the safety and efficiency of those operations.

Samsara is publicly listed on the New York Stock Exchange under the ticker symbol "IOT".

== History ==
Samsara was founded in 2015 by Sanjit Biswas and John Bicket, who had previously co-founded and sold Meraki to Cisco Systems in 2012. The company was initially created to provide sensor technology for industrial operations, with Andreessen Horowitz as an early Series A round investor.

The company experienced rapid growth, achieving unicorn status in March 2018 with a valuation of over $1 billion. A series of subsequent funding rounds, backed by investors including Andreessen Horowitz, General Catalyst, and Tiger Global Management, raised the company's valuation to $6.3 billion by September 2019.

In December 2021, Samsara held an initial public offering on the New York Stock Exchange under the ticker symbol "IOT". The company sold 35 million shares, raising $805 million at a valuation of $11.5 billion.

By December 2023, Samsara announced that it had surpassed $1 billion in annual recurring revenue (ARR).

In 2022, the company filed a bid protest against the U.S. Postal Service's decision to award a $300 million contract to Geotab, a challenge that was ultimately unsuccessful.

Samsara has been recognized with several workplace awards, including being named one of Glassdoor's Best Places to Work in 2023 and among the Best-Led Companies in 2024.

== Market significance ==
Several market research reports place Samsara as one of the leading providers in the commercial telematics market. The company is often ranked as a market leader, particularly in North America, alongside competitors including Geotab, Lytx, and Wialon.

The company has established partnerships with several major vehicle manufacturers, including Ford Motor Company, General Motors, and Navistar, to integrate its technology with their vehicles. In addition to its commercial clients, such as DHL and Sysco, Samsara also provides its fleet telematics system to public-sector organizations including the cities of Boston, Houston, and New Orleans, and the states of New Jersey and Tennessee.
