= National Association of Fleet Administrators =

NAFA Fleet Management Association, formerly known as the National Association of Fleet Administrators, Inc., is a not-for-profit, individual membership professional society for professionals who practice fleet management, managing fleets of automobiles, SUVs, trucks, vans, and a wide range of specialized mobile equipment for organizations in the United States and Canada.

== History ==
NAFA was founded in 1957. The association provides its members a range of services, including certification, statistical research, monthly and annual publications, regional chapter meetings, government representation, annual conferences and trade shows, and educational seminars on topics ranging from vehicle specification to telematics and fleet digitalization.

== Scope ==
NAFA's members are responsible for the specification, acquisition, maintenance, asset tracking, and disposal of more than 3.5 million vehicles, including 1.1 million trucks. Across North America, NAFA members have more than 350,000 medium- and heavy-duty trucks in their fleets, totaling more than $21 billion in assets for those vehicles.

== Fleet types ==
The more traditional fleet vehicles of passenger cars, vans, and SUVs managed by NAFA members total 1.4 million and account for $45 billion in assets, as well as a quarter million police sedans; more than 58,000 emergency vehicles (which often utilize automatic vehicle location technology); and 386,000 pieces of specialty equipment used by public service and commercial fleets.
