= Asset tracking =

Methods for tracking the location of physical assets

Asset tracking is a specific application of telematics using a tracking system to monitor the location and status of physical assets. It involves using location data to know where an asset is, where it has been, and when it is expected to arrive at its destination. While the underlying technology is the same as automatic vehicle location technology used for a vehicle tracking system or in fleet management, asset tracking typically refers to the monitoring of non-vehicular assets, such as shipping containers, tools, medical equipment, and high-value inventory.

== Common tracking technologies ==
Asset tracking systems utilize a variety of technologies to determine and report the location of an asset. The choice of technology depends on factors such as the required accuracy, the operational environment (indoor vs. outdoor), and the cost.

=== Outdoor / wide-area tracking ===
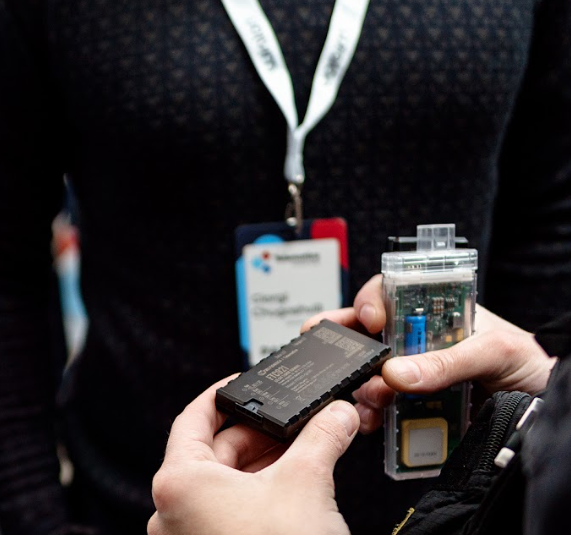
A GPS asset tracker; the transparent casing on the right reveals its internal components.

For assets that move over long distances and are primarily outdoors, satellite-based technologies are the standard.

- GPS trackers: These are self-contained devices that use GNSS signals to determine their precise location. They are the most common technology for tracking high-value mobile assets like shipping containers, trailers, and heavy machinery. A built-in cellular or satellite modem, often part of a telematic control unit, then transmits this location data and other telemetry to a central software platform. Unlike devices designed for vehicles, these asset trackers typically rely on a long-life internal battery for power.
- LoRa: This is a long-range, low-power radio technology that can be used for both indoor and outdoor tracking. Its ability to transmit signals over several kilometers makes it suitable for tracking assets across large areas like ports or industrial sites.

=== Indoor / local-area tracking ===
Tracking assets within a confined space like a warehouse, hospital, or factory, where satellite signals are unavailable, requires different technologies.

- RFID: RFID systems use radio waves to automatically identify and track tags attached to assets. They are used for "choke-point" tracking, where assets are automatically logged as they pass through a specific point, such as a doorway or loading bay. Active RFID tags have their own power source and can transmit over longer distances, while passive tags are powered by the reader.
- BLE: BLE tags are small, battery-powered beacons that continuously transmit a signal. Gateways or smartphones can detect these signals to provide a real-time location of assets within a building, making them popular for tracking tools and mobile equipment.
- Wi-Fi positioning: This method uses the existing network of Wi-Fi access points within a facility to determine an asset's location, often by measuring the signal strength from multiple points.

=== Simple identification and auditing ===
For basic inventory control and manual audits, simpler technologies are used.

- Barcodes and QR codes: These are the most cost-effective and widely used methods for asset tracking. An operator uses a handheld scanner or smartphone to read the barcode, which logs the asset's location and status in a central database.
- NFC: NFC tags allow for "tap-to-track" functionality. An operator can simply tap an NFC-enabled smartphone to an asset's tag to retrieve its information or update its status.

== Applications by industry ==
Asset tracking is an application of the Internet of Things and is used across numerous industries to improve efficiency, reduce theft, and automate inventory management.

=== Construction ===
In the construction industry, asset tracking is used to manage high-value tools, equipment, and heavy machinery. GPS trackers are attached to large assets like excavators and generators to prevent theft and monitor their location and usage across different job sites. For smaller tools, BLE tags and barcodes are used to create an automated check-in/check-out system.

=== Mining ===
In the mining industry, a fleet telematics system is used to monitor the location and status of heavy equipment such as dump trucks and excavators. This helps to optimize the vehicle dispatch process, track fuel consumption through fuel-management systems to prevent fuel theft, and monitor operational parameters to schedule preventative maintenance.

=== Healthcare ===
Hospitals and clinics use asset tracking to manage critical medical equipment. RFID and BLE tags are placed on mobile assets like infusion pumps and wheelchairs. This allows staff to quickly locate necessary equipment, which improves patient care and reduces the time wasted searching for items.

=== Vending machines ===
Asset tracking is used to monitor the status and inventory of smart vending machines. A tracking device inside the machine can report its location and transmit real-time data on stock levels. This allows operators to optimize their restocking routes.

=== Logistics and warehousing ===
In logistics, asset tracking is a component of track and trace systems. It is used to monitor the location of goods as they move through the supply chain. Barcodes and QR codes are used for individual packages, while RFID and GPS trackers are used for larger assets like pallets and shipping containers.

=== IT asset management (ITAM) ===
Organizations use asset tracking to manage their IT hardware, including laptops and servers. By tagging each item, IT departments can automate inventory audits and manage the lifecycle of their technology assets.

=== Aviation and airports ===
Airports use asset tracking to manage non-motorized ground support equipment (GSE), such as baggage carts and dollies. By attaching ruggedized tracking devices to this equipment, airport operators can improve utilization and reduce turnaround times.

=== Consumer asset tracking ===
In the consumer market, asset tracking devices are used to help individuals keep track of personal items such as keys, luggage, and pets. The market for these devices is growing rapidly, with the number of active consumer asset tracking units in Europe and North America projected to reach 28 million by 2026.

== See also ==
- Barcode
- Near-field communication
- Radio-frequency identification
- Track and trace
