= Vehicle location data =

Data collection on vehicles

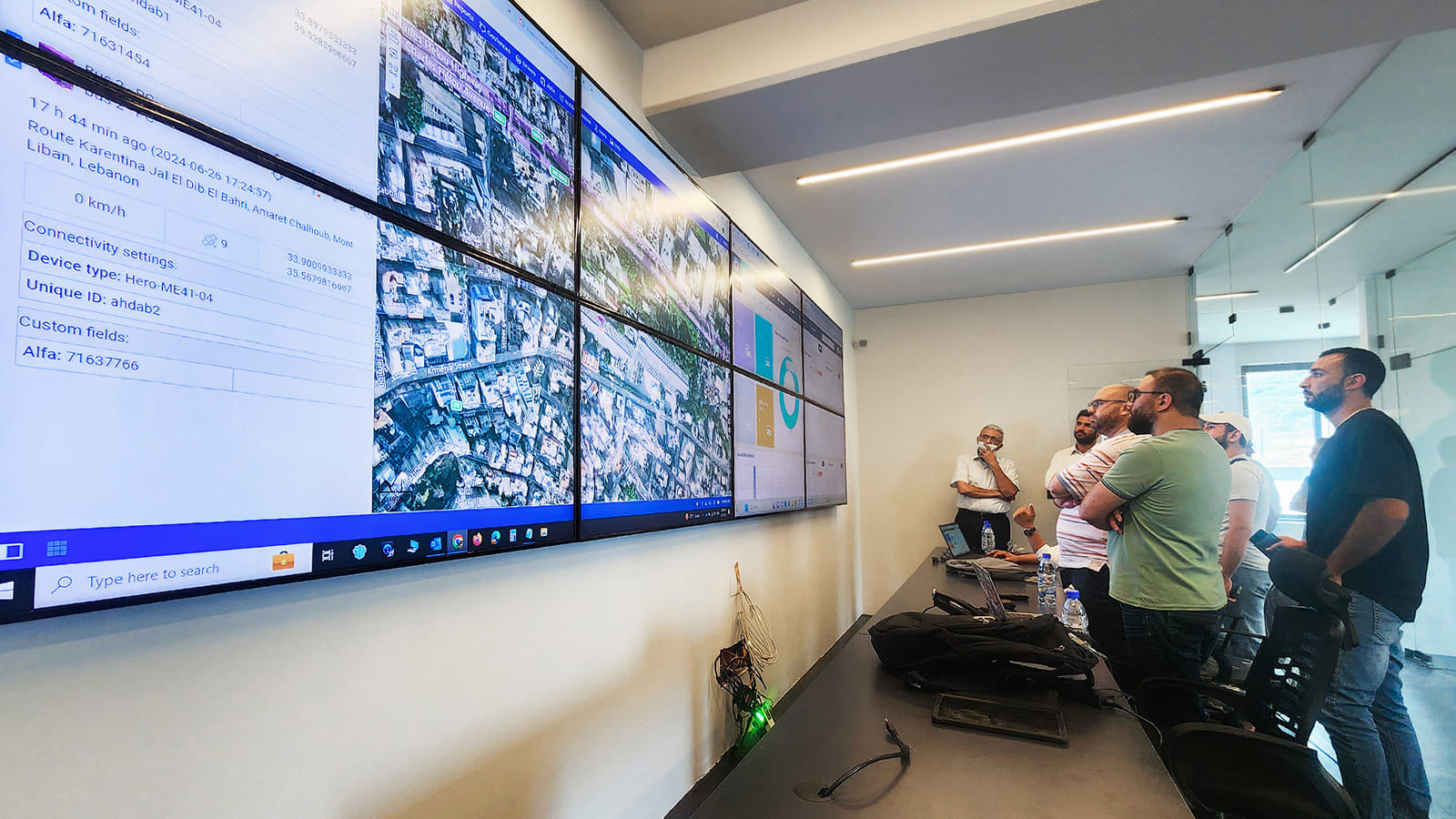
A fleet management control room where staff monitor real-time vehicle location data on a large video wall.

Vehicle location data is the big data collection of vehicle locations, including automatic vehicle location data, a core feature of any vehicle tracking system. This usually includes times and often photographs as well, a practice known as video telematics. The process of collecting this data from remote assets via telemetry is a core component of telematics, often managed by a telematic control unit. Its application in the commercial sector forms the basis of fleet digitalization and is central to any fleet telematics system.

Common methods of data collection include automatic number plate recognition from cameras, such as a Dashcam, and radio-frequency identification (RFID) from transponders. In commercial contexts, a dedicated GPS tracking unit is often used for this purpose, forming part of a wider tracking system. Databases of this information are maintained by both government and private entities. For businesses, this data is essential for fleet management tasks like Track and trace, enabling vehicle repossession, and consumer profiling through methods like Driver scoring. Government databases have been subjected to legal orders for location data, and access may be granted in both criminal and civil cases.

== Automatic number plate recognition ==
Vehicle registration plates may be automatically scanned with equipment, mountable on vehicles, that identifies an image characteristic of a registration plates, takes a photograph, and reads and records the registration number. Such scanning may be done by government or private industry. Private industry collects this information for profit through, directly or indirectly, activities such as consumer profiling and repossession. Companies have collected over 1 billion scans of registration plates in the United States, stored in multiple national databases.

== Transponders ==
Radio-frequency identification (RFID) read from dedicated short-range communication transponders voluntarily obtained by citizens for electronic toll collection enable recording of time and location data at toll crossings. Scanning equipment has also been installed at additional, non-toll locations, enabling further data collection. Transponders have also been hacked, allowing reading and tracking by unauthorized parties.

== Privacy concerns ==
The American Civil Liberties Union issued a report on license plate tracking, finding that the vast majority of scans collected are the vehicles of innocent persons.

== See also ==
- Indoor positioning system (IPS)
- Parking lot
