= Traccar =

Free and open source GPS tracking server

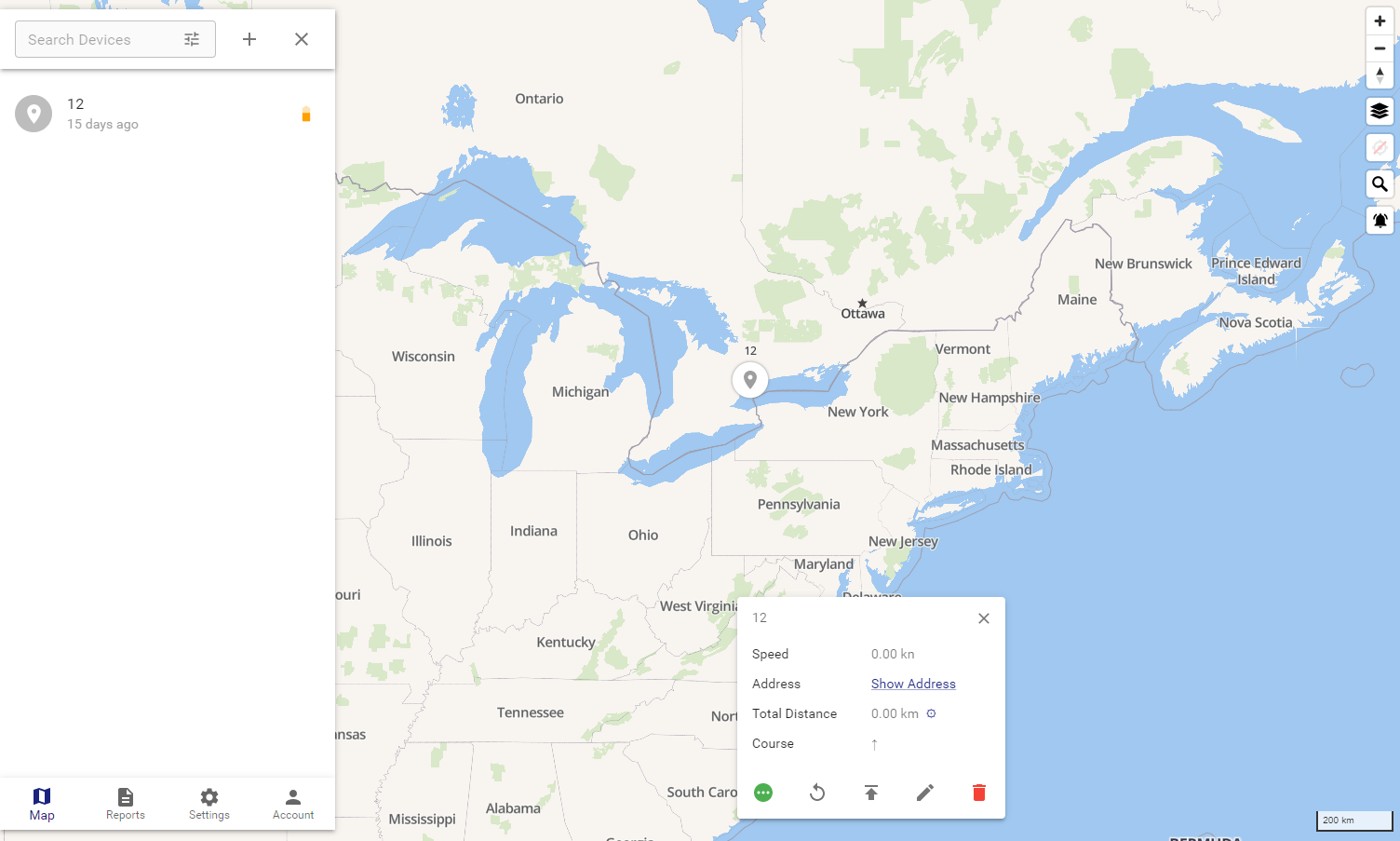
- Developer: Anton Tananaev
- Release: 2012
- Stable release: 6.8.1 / July 7, 2025; 16 months ago
- Written in: Java
- Type: Open source software
- Website: www.traccar.org
- Repository: github.com/traccar/traccar

Traccar is a free and open source GPS tracking server. As of 2024, Traccar claims to support more than 2,000 different models of GPS tracking devices.

== History ==
Traccar is owned by Traccar Limited and was founded in 2009. Anton Tananaev, the founder of Traccar, in an interview said that he began writing the software in 2009 and made it open source in early 2010.

In 2016, Traccar was one of the winners of the 10th Open SW Developer Competition held in South Korea.

According to a 2019 report by Windows Report, Traccar was noted amongst the seven best free software solutions for fleet management and GPS tracking.

== Products ==
Traccar has three main applications called Traccar Server, Traccar Manager and Traccar Client. Traccar Server is the main software which include the back-end for device communication and the front-end web interface for managing the GPS tracking devices. The Traccar Manager is a mobile based front end application which can be used to manage GPS tracking devices. And the third is Traccar Client, a mobile based application which acts as an alternative to GPS tracking hardware and can be used to report the mobile phone's location to the Traccar Server.
