= GPSWOX =

GPS tracking software

- Industry: Global Positioning System
- Founder: Martynas Kavaliauskas
- Headquarters: London, United Kingdom
- Area served: Worldwide
- Website: gpswox.com

GPSWOX is an online GPS tracking software and fleet management system located in London, United Kingdom. The company was founded in 2014 by the current CEO Martynas Kavaliauskas. The software is used to track objects that include car, van, truck, motorcycle, cargo, boat, bicycle, people, pet and mobile. GPSWOX software is compatible with GPS trackers brands and smartphones.
