= Pogoseat =

- Release: 2012
- Operating system: iOS; Android
- Type: In-Event Seat Upgrades
- Website: www.pogoseat.com

Pogoseat is a US startup company founded in 2012 in Los Angeles, California. It develops software that is used to help professional sports teams and live-entertainment venues sell more tickets and enhance the fan experience. Its white-labelled mobile web application offers ticket holders to upgrade seats before or during sporting events, concerts, broadway and any live-entertainment venue. The app uses GPS tracking to show a user's location and a map of the seats available at a venue. Fans can buy open marketed seats that went unsold at a reduced cost. The seats are discounted from face value based on a number of factors some of which include the fans original ticket price, time remaining at the event and the score. The functionality is seamlessly embedded into any native 3rd party app such as a team or venue app. In addition to upgrade technology, Pogoseat also offers a number of alternative solutions such as text-based ticketing, to help venues sell last-minute tickets via SMS, and a mobile subscription service which is redefining the traditional season ticket model.

== History ==
The Golden State Warriors and Stanford men's basketball were the first to use Pogoseat. Pogoseat was the first company to pioneer a seat upgrade integration with Ticketmaster, North America. The service expanded to other live entertainment with its partnership with Broadway San Diego.

The company received $100,000 in a round of funding in January 2014. In February 2014, Pogoseat partnered with Barclays Center in Brooklyn. Pogoseat also partnered with the San Francisco Giants in 2014 on its MLB Ballpark app to let fans upgrade their seat before and during games.
