= Trailer tracking =

Trailer tracking is tracking the position of an articulated vehicle’s trailer unit through a tracking device fitted to the trailer. A communication network or satellite network is then used to transfer this positional data to a centralized collection point. Trailer tracking is used to increase productivity by optimizing the use of trailer fleets.

== Trailer tracking system ==
Trailer tracking systems can provide essential information to trailer operators on; status, location, door activity, coupling/uncoupling, and history. These systems utilize the information to provide reliable and protected services to shippers of perishable commodities.

Trailer Tracking is also a trucking term in which, when a Semi turns a corner the trailer tires will be closer to the curb (even jump the curb if semi turns to sharp) than the truck cab will be.

Trailer tracking systems require 4 essential components to operate.

1. Tracking Device
2. Communication Network
3. Back-end Server and Database
4. User Interface Software

== See also ==
- GPS tracking server
- GPS tracking unit
