= Vehicle remarketing =

Vehicle remarketing is a component of the fleet management process, representing the final stage in a vehicle's lifecycle. It involves the systematic and controlled disposal of fleet and leasing vehicles once they have reached the end of their operational term or lease agreement. The primary goal of remarketing is to maximize the recovery of a vehicle's residual value, mitigating the financial impact of vehicle depreciation. Fleet and leasing companies aim to sell these vehicles quickly and efficiently, either to trade buyers or directly to consumers, to convert a depreciating asset back into capital.

In vehicle leasing, after the lease expires, the lessee either returns the vehicle to the supplier or buys it. The vehicles that are not purchased by the driver become an unwanted asset for the fleet or leasing company because of vehicle depreciation and they look to channel intermediaries to relinquish the stock on their behalf quickly and in high volumes. Remarketing can be done to trade or to consumers.

== Key performance indicators ==
Key performance indicators for vehicle remarketing are the disposal price achieved, usually in reference to a trade guide price (such as CAP Clean in the UK or Black Book in Canada) and the days-to-sell, which is the number of days between end of lease and disposal of the car. Different remarketing routes targeting different customers are available and offer different options regarding these KPI.

== Remarketing to trade ==
End of lease vehicles that are not purchased by the lessee have traditionally been remarketed through wholesale vehicle auctions such as Manheim Auctions, ADESA Auctions, British Car Auctions or Aston Barclay in the UK. During a car dealer auction, the vehicles are typically sold to car dealerships who in turn will retail them to consumers. In the US, in 2005, 2.7 million fleet vehicles were sold through auctions.

== Remarketing to drivers and employees ==
In a company fleet, vehicles nearing their end of lease are made available for purchase to the current driver, and to other employees of the company operating the fleet. The benefits for the fleet and for the leasing company is a reduction in days-to-sell, as vehicles remarketed that way are sold before reaching the end of lease.
