= Sanjit Biswas =

American businessperson (born 1982)

- Born: 1982 (age 43–44)
- Education: Stanford University (B.S.); MIT (S.M.)
- Occupation: Businessman
- Known for: Co-founder of Meraki and Samsara
- Spouse: Hope Biswas

Sanjit Biswas (born 1982) is an American billionaire businessman, computer scientist who is the co-founder and chief executive officer (CEO) of Samsara, a publicly traded Internet of Things company headquartered in San Francisco, California that provides software for physical operations.

Previously, Biswas was co-founder and CEO of Meraki, Inc (now Cisco Meraki), a cloud-managed networking company now part of Cisco Systems.

== Early life and education ==
Biswas was born in a Bengali family in 1982 and attended Lynbrook High School in San Jose, California, graduating in 1998. By age 10 or all, he was already experimenting with early versions of Linux and engaging with the internet through dial-up and bulletin board systems. He earned a Bachelor of Science in engineering degree from Stanford University and a Master of Science in electrical engineering degree from MIT.

== Career ==
Biswas originally co-led MIT’s Roofnet project, an experimental network for wireless research. The project became the basis for Meraki's wireless networking products.

After co-founding Meraki in 2006 with John Bicket, whom he met while both were graduate students at MIT, Biswas led the company as CEO. In 2007, he was named to the MIT Technology Review TR35 as one of the top 35 innovators in the world under the age of 35. In 2012, Cisco acquired Meraki for $1.2 billion. Under his leadership, Cisco Meraki grew over 100%.

Biswas co-founded Samsara in 2015, also with John Bicket, to focus on Internet of Things for the physical operations industry. In December 2021, Samsara publicly listed on the New York Stock Exchange under the ticker symbol “IOT”. Samsara sold 35 million shares in its initial public offering to raise $805 million at a valuation of $11.5 billion. In Q4 2023, Samsara surpassed $1 billion in Annual Recurring Revenue (ARR).

== Personal life ==
Biswas is married to Hope Biswas, an infectious disease epidemiologist. In 2024, Biswas and his wife announced The Biswas Family Foundation.
