= GPS animal tracking =

Scientific practice

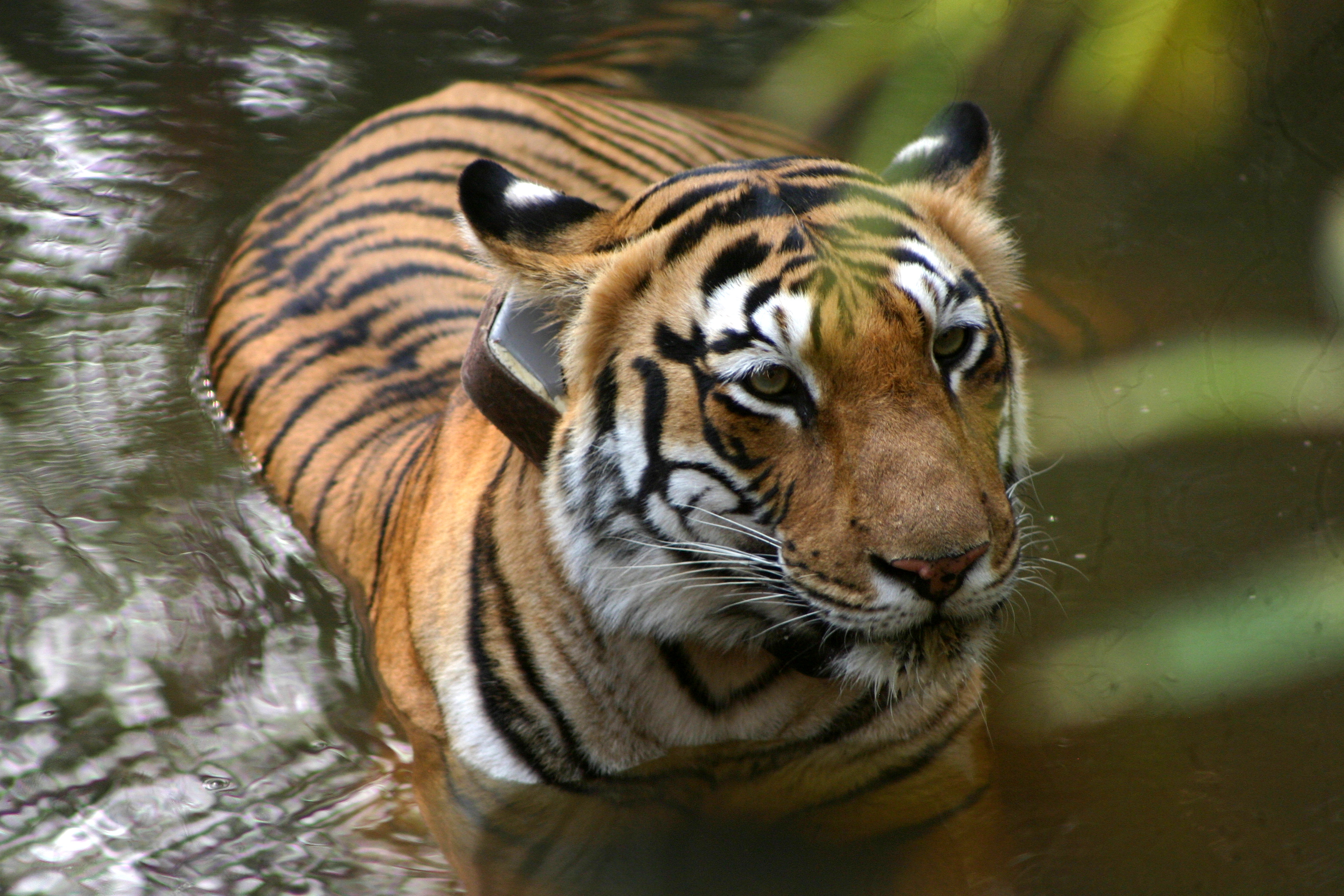
Tigress with radio collar in Tadoba Andhari National Park, India

GPS animal tracking is a process whereby biologists, scientific researchers, or conservation agencies can remotely observe relatively fine-scale movement or migratory patterns in a free-ranging wild animal using the Global Positioning System (GPS) and optional environmental sensors or automated data-retrieval technologies such as Argos satellite uplink, mobile data telephony or GPRS and a range of analytical software tools.

A GPS tracking device will generally record and store location data at a predetermined interval or on interrupt by an environmental sensor. These data may be held pending recovery of the device or relayed to a central data store or internet-connected computer using an embedded cellular (GPRS), radio, or satellite modem. The animal's location can then be plotted against a map or chart in near real-time or, when analysing the track later, using a GIS package or custom software.

GPS tracking devices may also be attached to domestic animals, such as pets, pedigree livestock and working dogs. Some owners use these collars for geofencing of their pets.

GPS wildlife tracking can place additional constraints on size and weight and may not allow for post-deployment recharging or replacement of batteries or correction of attachment. As well as allowing in-depth study of animal behaviour and migration, the high-resolution tracks available from a GPS-enabled system can potentially allow for tighter control of animal-borne communicable diseases such as the H5N1 strain of avian influenza.

Animal telemetry is defined as the transmission of data from animals at a distance, usually through the use of electronic devices. The traditional method of telemetry was the use of very high frequency (VHF) radio tracking. In this method, the researchers had to follow the animals and locate them by using a receiver. Although this method was successful, it was a tedious task. GPS animal tracking can be considered an advancement over the traditional method of telemetry. In this method, the GPS device sends accurate location information at a given time interval.

Biologging is a more comprehensive approach to the study of the movements and behaviors of animals. In this approach, a device is deployed on an animal to monitor both movement and other related information. While GPS tracking devices are mainly deployed for the determination of the location of an animal, biologging devices can be deployed for the determination of the behavior and other related information. In this regard, GPS tracking can be regarded as a part of a biologging system. Difference between GPS tracking and multi-sensor data collection

== History ==
Earlier wildlife monitoring methods that mainly relied on manual tracking and direct observation served as the foundation for the development of GPS animal tracking. The scope and precision of data collection were constrained using physical markers or visual animal tracking prior to the development of electronic systems. Very high frequency (VHF) radio telemetry took over as the primary technique for researching animal movement in the middle of the 20th century also known as wildlife radio telemetry. This method required researchers to physically track signals in the field by attaching a radio transmitter to an animal and using a handheld receiver to locate it. Although VHF telemetry greatly enhanced the capacity to study wildlife, it was labor-intensive, had limited range and terrain, and offered relatively low spatial resolution.

The introduction of satellite-based tracking systems in the late 20th century signaled a significant shift in animal tracking technology. Systems such as Argos, which were introduced in the 1970s, enabled scientists to track animals over long distances using satellite signals. Although satellite-based tracking systems in the early years were characterized by a relatively low positional accuracy compared to contemporary standards, these systems were mostly used for large animals that could carry heavier transmitters. Despite these limitations, satellite-based animal tracking formed the basis for global animal monitoring, especially for migratory species such as birds and marine life.

However, with the advent of Global Positioning System (GPS) technology in the 1990s, a significant milestone was achieved in animal tracking systems. With the availability of civilian GPS signals, scientists began working on the development of GPS-based animal tracking systems that could offer highly accurate results. Although the early GPS-based animal tracking systems were large, heavy, and power-intensive, they were initially used for large animals only. With the advent of highly advanced technology in the coming years, the size, weight, and power consumption of these systems were significantly minimized, making them highly efficient for a wide range of animal species.

With the advent of the 21st century, animal tracking systems using GPS technology have become even more efficient with the integration of contemporary communication systems with these devices. These devices are now capable of sending signals through satellite networks, as well as cellular networks, making them highly efficient for real-time monitoring without the need for recovering the devices. With the integration of biologging devices, these systems are now capable of offering a wide range of research opportunities, making them a highly significant tool in the field of ecology, conservation biology, and wildlife management.

== Applications ==
=== Wildlife conservation ===
Global positioning system (GPS) tracking is one of the most used methods in the field of wildlife conservation. In this method, the movements, migration routes, and habitat use of animals are monitored using the global positioning system. The spatial and temporal resolutions provided by the GPS tracking method allow the identification of critical habitats, migration routes, and breeding grounds, which are essential for the survival of species. The method has been found to be very useful in the conservation of endangered species, as it provides the opportunity for continuous tracking without invading the habitat of the species.

=== Agriculture and livestock ===
In the agricultural sector, the application of GPS tracking for animals is used to monitor the movement of the livestock. This has helped in the management of the grazing patterns of the animals and has ensured the efficient use of the resources available for the pasture. This has also ensured the adoption of sustainable farming practices. GPS devices have also helped in the early detection of abnormal behavior of the animals, which is usually a result of illness or injury. Which has ensured the management of the health of the animals and the efficiency of the operations.

=== Pet tracking ===
One of the areas where GPS tracking devices have been employed is the monitoring of domestic animals, especially those that serve as human companions, like dogs and cats. The use of GPS tracking devices in the monitoring of these animals ensures the owners’ ability to trace the whereabouts of their pets in case they stray. The use of GPS tracking devices in the lives of the general population is an indication of the technology’s availability for use outside the scientific and industrial community.

=== Scientific research ===
One of the areas where GPS tracking devices have been employed is the monitoring of domestic animals, especially those that serve as human companions, like dogs and cats. The use of GPS tracking devices in the monitoring of these animals ensures the owners’ ability to trace the whereabouts of their pets in case they stray. The use of GPS tracking devices in the lives of the general population is an indication of the technology’s availability for use outside the scientific and industrial community.

== Attachment ==
=== Collar attachment ===
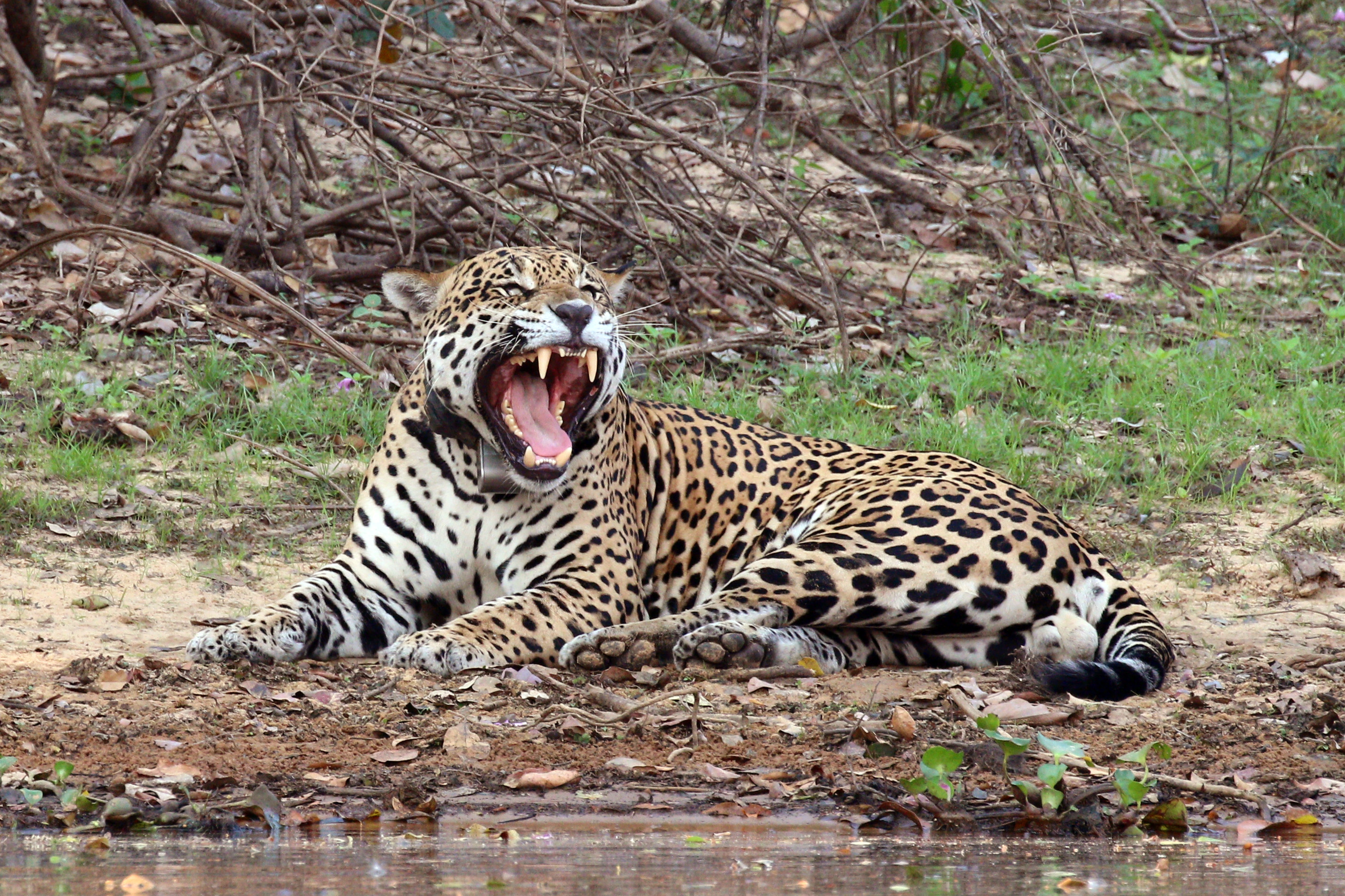
A jaguar wearing a tracking collar

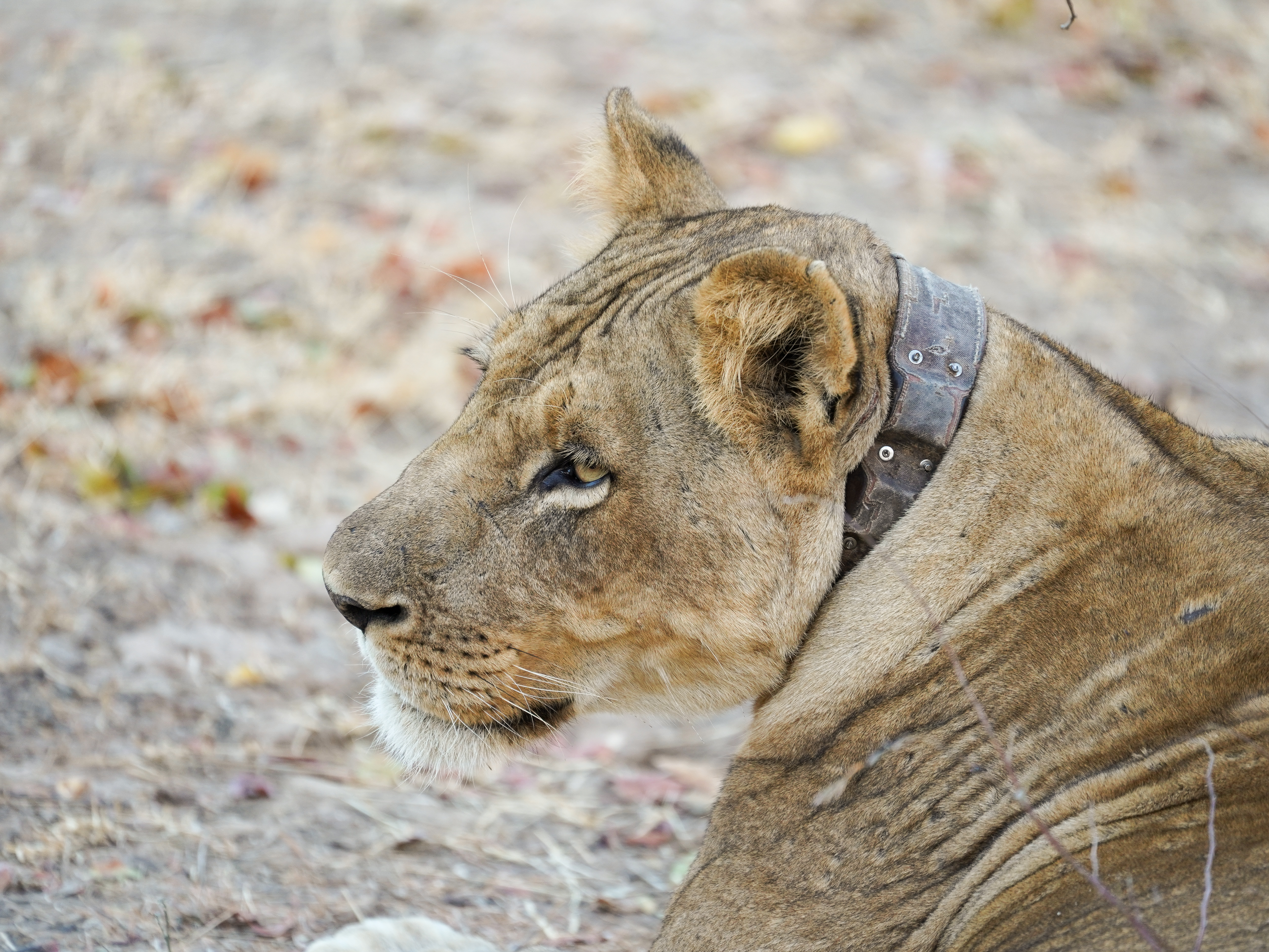
Lioness with a tracking collar, South Luangwa National Park, Zambia

Collar attachment is the primary technique where the subject has a suitable body type and behaviour. Tracking collars are typically used on the animal's neck (assuming the head has a larger circumference than the neck) but also on a limb, perhaps around an ankle. Suitable animals for neck attachment include primates, large cats, some bears, etc. Limb attachment works well in animals such as kiwi, where the foot is much larger than the ankle.

=== Harness attachment ===
Harness attachments may be used when collar attachment is unsuitable, such as for animals whose neck diameter may exceed that of the head. Examples of this type of animal may include pigs, Tasmanian devils, etc. Large, long-necked birds such as the greylag goose may also need to be fitted with a harness to prevent the removal of the tag by the subject.

=== Direct attachment ===
Direct attachment is used on animals where a collar cannot be used, such as birds, reptiles, and marine mammals.

In the case of birds, the GPS unit must be very lightweight to avoid interfering with the bird's ability to fly or swim. The device is usually attached by gluing or, for short deployments, taping to the bird. The unit will then naturally fall off when the bird subsequently moults.

In the case of reptiles such as crocodiles and turtles, gluing the unit onto the animal's skin or carapace using epoxy (or similar material) is the most common method and minimises discomfort.

In deployments on marine mammals such as phocids or otariids, the device would be glued to the fur and fall off during the annual moult. Units used with turtles or marine animals have to resist the corrosive effects of seawater and be waterproof to pressures of up to 200bar.

=== Other attachment methods ===
Other applications include rhinoceros tracking, for which a hole may be drilled in the animal's horn and a device implanted. Compared to other methods, implanted transmitters may suffer from a reduced range as the large mass of the animal's body can absorb some transmitted power.

There are also GPS implants for large snakes, such as ones offered by Telemetry Solutions.

== Software ==
=== Embedded ===
Duty Cycle Scheduling - GPS devices typically record data about the animal's exact location and store readings at pre-set intervals known as duty cycles. By setting the interval between readings, the researcher can determine the device's lifespan - persistent readings drain battery power more rapidly. In contrast, longer intervals between readings might provide lower resolution over a more extended deployment.

Release Timers - Some devices can be programmed to drop off at a set time/date rather than requiring recapture and manual retrieval. Some may also be fitted with a low-power radio receiver allowing a remote signal to trigger the automatic release.

=== Analytical ===
Locational data provided by GPS devices can be displayed using Geographic information system (GIS) packages such as the open-source GRASS or plotted and prepared for display on the World Wide Web using packages such as Generic Mapping Tools (GMT), FollowDem (developed by Ecrins National Park to track ibex) or Maptool.

Statistical software such as R can be used to display and examine data and may reveal behavioural patterns or trends.

== Data retrieval ==
=== Argos ===
GPS tracking devices have been linked to an Argos Platform Transmitter Terminal (PTT), enabling them to transmit data via the Argos System, a scientific satellite system that has been in use since 1978. Users can download their data directly from Argos via telnet and process the raw data to extract their transmitted information.

Where satellite uplink fails due to antenna damage, it may be possible to intercept the underpowered transmission locally using a satellite uplink receiver.

=== GSM ===
GPS location data can be transmitted via the GSM mobile/cell phone network, using SMS messages or internet protocols over a GPRS session. The EPASTO GPS is dedicated to following and locating cows.

=== UHF/VHF ===
GPS data may be transmitted via short-range radio signals and decoded using a custom receiver.

== Complications ==
=== Effects on animals ===
It was believed that GPS collars used on animals affected their behavior. This theory was tested on elephants that lived in a zoo in the United States. They studied how the elephants behaved with and without the collars simultaneously for both scenarios and saw no change in behavior.

A study was done with mantled howler monkeys to see if GPS Ball and Chain collars affected the monkeys behavior. The study involved observing a group of collared and uncollared female howler monkeys. There was no significant difference in the collared and uncollared behavior, but when the study was over, it was discovered that the monkeys had injuries. The collars had caused damage to the necks of the monkeys; one had minor scratches and some swelling, while four other monkeys had deep cuts from the collar. Two of the monkeys with the lacerations had their tissue healing over the collar.

=== Tracking technology and battery life ===
GPS animal tracking uses satellite technology to monitor the real-time location, movement patterns, and behavior of wildlife or pets, aiding in research, conservation, and pet safety.

There is a need for Internet-enabled tracking collars for animals to be designed with a multiple-year lifespan to avoid interference with the animals. Satellite tracking devices are deployed in ultra-remote areas. To preserve battery power, the device only powers on when required. GSM or cellular technology is widely deployed where connectivity is available - however, GSM is also highly intensive on battery power. Devices, like Airtag from Apple, either have a large battery or are only powered on when required, and may need to be constantly recharged.

Sigfox or LoRa are new technologies powering the Internet of Things connectivity. These technologies are beginning to be deployed in remote areas due to their ease of deployment and incredibly long range. The advantages of these technologies for an animal tracking collar are that the device form size can be minimised, and the battery life is considerably extended. Sigfox has already covered large parts of the Kruger National Park in South Africa, allowing rangers to track smaller forms of wildlife better.

== Limitations ==
=== Technical ===
There are also limitations of the GPS tracking technology that may impact the accuracy of the results obtained from the tracking of the animals. One of the limitations of the tracking technology is the inability of the GPS tracking system to function in environments where satellite signals are hindered or obstructed, such as in a forest setting or underwater environments. In such environments, the GPS tracking system may fail to produce results or may produce partial results for the locations of the animals being tracked. In addition to the limitations of the tracking technology, there are also limitations of accuracy of the results obtained from the tracking of the animals. Even when the tracking technology functions optimally, there may be some inaccuracies in the results obtained from the tracking of the animals.

=== Power ===
The availability of power, on the other hand, is one major constraint in the use of GPS tracking devices for animal tracking. The fact that most tracking devices run on battery power means that the period during which the devices can be used for tracking animal movements is limited. The limited lifespan of the batteries, especially in situations where the devices cannot be retrieved, makes it difficult to carry out long-term studies on animal movements. There also appears to be a trade-off between the lifespan of the batteries and the frequency of the data collected, where the higher the frequency, the more detailed the data on animal movements, but the shorter the lifespan of the batteries. The use of solar-powered devices, though helpful, appears to be limited to environmental factors.

=== Environmental ===
Environmental factors may also play a role in the performance of GPS animal tracking systems. Terrain features such as steep valleys, cliffs, and vegetation may cause difficulties in the quality of data received from the system. Weather conditions such as excessive cloudiness, rain, and other atmospheric disturbances may also play a role in the quality of data received from the system. Such factors may cause inconsistencies in the quality of data received from different animal habitats.

== Ethical considerations ==
GPS animal tracking raises ethical concerns related to animal welfare and research practices. In some instances, animal tracking devices may influence animal behavior or cause them harm, especially when the devices are large compared to the animal. To minimize the effects of animal tracking devices on animal welfare, there are guidelines that must be adhered to by researchers. In addition, studies involving animal tracking must be approved by ethical committees.

== See also ==
- ICARUS Initiative – Project tracking animals from space
- Automatic Packet Reporting System – Amateur radio telemetry forwarding protocol
- Electronic tagging – Form of surveillance using a body-worn electronic device
- Surveillance – Monitoring something for the purposes of influencing, protecting, or suppressing it
- Telematics – Interdisciplinary field that encompasses telecommunications
- Telemetry – Automatic collection and transmission of data
