= Automatic vehicle location =

Technology for determining a vehicle's geographic location

Automatic vehicle location (AVL or ~locating; telelocating in EU) is a means for automatically determining and transmitting the geographic location of a vehicle. This vehicle location data, from one or more vehicles, may then be collected by a vehicle tracking system to manage an overview of vehicle travel. As of 2017, GPS technology has reached the point of having the transmitting device be smaller than the size of a human thumb (thus easier to conceal), able to run 6 months or more between battery charges, easy to communicate with smartphones (merely requiring a duplicate SIM card from one's mobile phone carrier in most cases) — all for less than $20 USD.

Most commonly, the location is determined using GPS and the transmission mechanism is SMS, GPRS, or a satellite or terrestrial radio from the vehicle to a radio receiver. A single antenna unit covering all the needed frequency bands can be employed. GSM and EVDO are the most common services applied, because of the low data rate needed for AVL, and the low cost and near-ubiquitous nature of these public networks. The low bandwidth requirements also allow for satellite technology to receive telemetry data at a moderately higher cost, but across a global coverage area and into very remote locations not covered well by terrestrial radio or public carriers. Other options for determining actual location, for example in environments where GPS illumination is poor, are dead reckoning, i.e. inertial navigation, or active RFID systems or cooperative RTLS systems. These systems may be applied in combination in some cases. In addition, terrestrial radio positioning systems using a low frequency switched packet radio network have also been used as an alternative to GPS based systems.

== Applications ==
Automatic vehicle locating is a powerful tool for managing fleets of vehicles such as service vehicles, emergency vehicles, and public transport vehicles such as buses and trains. It is also used to track mobile assets, such as non wheeled construction equipment, non motorized trailers, and mobile power generators. AVL is often utilized by government agencies, such as Public Safety and Parks and Recreation, to track the movement of patrol units, emergency responders, and field workers.

Another purpose of tracking is to provide graded service or to manage a large driver and crewing staff effectively. For example, suppose an ambulance fleet has an objective of arriving at the location of a call for service within six minutes of receiving the request. Using an AVL system allows to evaluate the locations of all vehicles in service with drivers and other crew in order to pick the vehicle that will most likely arrive at the destination fastest, (meeting the service objective).

== Types of systems ==
=== Simple direction finding ===
Amateur radio and some cellular or PCS wireless systems use direction finding or triangulation of transmitter signals radiated by the mobile. This is sometimes called radio direction finding or RDF. The simplest forms of these systems calculate the bearing from two fixed sites to the mobile. This creates a triangle with endpoints at the two fixed points and the mobile. Trigonometry tells you roughly where the mobile transmitter is located. In wireless telephone systems, the phones transmit continually when off-hook, making continual tracking and the collection of many location samples possible. This is one type of location system required by Federal Communications Commission Rules for wireless Enhanced 911.

=== Former LORAN-based locating ===
Motorola offered a 1970s-era system based on the United States Coast Guard LORAN maritime navigation system. The LORAN system was intended for ships but signal levels on the US east- and west-coast areas were adequate for use with receivers in automobiles. The system may have been marketed under the Motorola model name Metricom. It consisted of an LF LORAN receiver and data interface box/modem connected to a separate two-way radio. The receiver and interface calculated a latitude and longitude in degrees, decimal degrees format based on the LORAN signals. This was sent over the radio as MDC-1200 or MDC-4800 data to a system controller, which plotted the mobile's approximate location on a map. The system worked reliably but sometimes had problems with electrical noise in urban areas. Sparking electric trolley poles or industrial plants which radiated electrical noise sometime overwhelmed the LORAN signals, affecting the system's ability to determine the mobile's geolocation. Because of the limited resolution, this type of system was impractical for small communities or operational areas such as a pit mine or port.

=== Signpost systems ===
To track and locate vehicles along fixed routes, a technology called Signpost transmitters is employed. This is used on transit routes and rail lines where the vehicles to be tracked continually operated on the same linear route. A transponder or RFID chip along the vehicle route would be polled as the train or bus traverses its route. As each transponder was passed, the moving vehicle would query and receive an ack, or handshake, from the signpost transmitter. A transmitter on the mobile would report passing the signpost to a system controller. This allows supervision, a call center, or a dispatch center to monitor the progress of the vehicle and assess whether or not the vehicle was on schedule. These systems are an alternative inside tunnels or other conveyances where GPS signals are blocked by terrain.

=== Today's GPS-based locating ===
The low price and ubiquity of Global Positioning System or GPS equipment has lent itself to more accurate and reliable telelocation systems. GPS signals are impervious to most electrical noise sources and do not require the user to install an entire system. Usually only a receiver to collect signals from the satellite segment is installed in each vehicle and radio or GSM to communicate the collected location data with a dispatch point.

Large private telelocation or AVL systems send data from GPS receivers in vehicles to a dispatch center over their private, user-owned radio backbone. These systems are used for businesses like parcel delivery and ambulances. Smaller systems which do not justify building a separate radio system use cellular or PCS data services to communicate location data from vehicles to their dispatching center. Location data is periodically polled from each vehicle in a fleet by a central controller or computer. In the simplest systems, data from the GPS receiver is displayed on a map allowing humans to determine the location of each vehicle. More complex systems feed the data into a computer assisted dispatch system which automates the process. For example, the computer assisted dispatch system may check the location of a call for service and then pick a list of the four closest ambulances. This narrows the dispatcher's choice from the entire fleet to an easier choice of four vehicles.

Some wireless carriers such as Nextel have decided GPS was the best way to provide the mandated location data for wireless Enhanced 9-1-1. Newer Nextel radios have embedded GPS receivers which are polled if 9-1-1 is dialed. The 9-1-1 center is provided with latitude and longitude from the radio's GPS receiver. In centers with computer-aided dispatch, the system may assign an address to the call based on these coordinates or may project an icon depicting the caller's location onto a map of the area.

=== Sensor-augmented AVL ===
The main purpose of using AVL is not only to locate the vehicles, but also to obtain information about engine data, fuel consumption, driver data and sensor data from i.e. doors, freezer room on trucks or air pressure. Such data can be obtained via the CAN-bus, via direct connections to AVL systems or via open bus systems such as UFDEX that both sends and receives data via SMS or GPRS in pure ASCII text format. Because most AVL consists of two parts, GPS and GSM modem with additional embedded AVL software contained in a microcontroller, most AVL systems are fixed for its purposes unless they connect to an open bus system for expansion possibilities.

With an open bus system the users can send invoices based on goods delivered with exact location, time and date data where if connected to scale, RFID or barcode readers, can make a fairly good automated system to avoid human errors.

In countries with high prices on gasoline external fuel sensors are used to prevent cases of fuel theft.

=== Logbook functions ===
Another scenario for sensor functions is to connect the AVL to driver information, to collect data about driving time, stops, or even driver absence from the vehicle. If the driver/worker conditions is such as the hourly rates for driving and working outside is not the same, this can be monitored by sensors, by using iButton or other personal identification devices. Later by analyzing log-file it is possible to get reports on any kind of events, like stops, visited streets, speed limits violations, etc.

== Differentiating between automatic vehicle location and events activated tracking systems ==
It might be helpful to draw a distinction between vehicle location systems which track automatically and event activated tracking systems which track when triggered by an event. There is increasingly crossover between the different systems and those with experience of this sector will be able to draw on a number of examples which break the rule.

A.V.L (Automatic Vehicle Location)
This type of vehicle tracking is normally used in the fleet or driver management sector. The unit is configured to automatically transmit its location at a set time interval, e.g. every 5 minutes. The unit is activated when the ignition is switched on/off.

E.A.T.S (Events Activated Tracking system)
This type of system is primarily used in connection with vehicle or driver security solutions. If, for example a thief breaks into your car and attempts to steal it, the tracking system can be triggered by the immobiliser unit or motion sensor being activated. A monitoring bureau will then be automatically notified that the unit has been activated and begin tracking the vehicle.

Some products on the market are a hybrid of both AVL and EATS technology. However industry practice has tended to lean towards a separation of these functions. It is worth taking note that vehicle tracking products tend to fall into one, not both of the technologies.

AVL technology is predominantly used when applying vehicle tracking to fleet or driver management solutions. The use of Automatic Vehicle Location is given in the following scenario; A car breaks down by the side of the road and the occupant calls a vehicle recovery company. The vehicle recovery company has several vehicles operating in the area. Without needing to call each driver to check his location the dispatcher can pinpoint the nearest recovery vehicle and assign it to the new job. If you were to incorporate the other aspects of vehicle telematics into this scenario; the dispatcher, rather than phoning the recovery vehicle operative, could transmit the job details directly to the operative's mobile data device, who would then use the in-vehicle satellite navigation to aid his journey to the job.

EATS technology is predominantly used when applying vehicle tracking to vehicle security solutions. An example of this distinction is given in the following scenario; A construction company owns some pieces of plant machinery that are regularly left unattended, at weekends, on building sites. Thieves break onto one site and a piece equipment, such as a digger, is loaded on the back of a flat bed truck and then driven away. Typically the ignition wouldn’t need to be turned on and as such most of the AVL products available wouldn’t typically be activated. Only products that included a unit that was activated by a motion sensor or GeoFence alarm event, would be activated.

Both AVL and EATS systems track, but often for different purposes.

== Special applications of automatic vehicle locating ==
Vehicle location technologies can be used in the following scenarios:

- Fleet management: when managing a fleet of vehicles, knowing the real-time location of all drivers allows management to meet customer needs more efficiently. Vehicle location information can also be used to verify that legal requirements are being met: for example, that drivers are taking rest breaks and obeying speed limits.
- Passenger Information: Real-time passenger information systems use predictions based on AVL input to show the expected arrival and departure times of public transport services.
- Asset tracking: companies needing to track valuable assets for insurance or other monitoring purposes can now plot the real-time asset location on a map and closely monitor movement and operating status. For example, haulage and logistics companies often operate trucks with detachable load carrying units. In this case, trailers can be tracked independently of the cabs used to drive them. Combining vehicle location with inventory management that can be used to reconcile which item is currently on which vehicle can be used to identify physical location down to the level of individual packages.
- Field worker management: companies with a field service or sales workforce can use information from vehicle tracking systems to plan field workers' time, schedule subsequent customer visits and be able to operate these departments efficiently.
- Covert surveillance: vehicle location devices attached covertly by law enforcement or espionage organizations can be used to track journeys made by individuals who are under surveillance

== See also ==
- Automatic number plate recognition
- Fleet telematics
- GPS tracking
- Intelligent transportation system
- LoJack
- Mobile phone tracking
- NextBus, an implementation used for public transportation systems
- OnStar, vehicle manufacturer implemented tracking systems.
- StarChase
- Telematics
- Tracking system
- Vehicle Infrastructure Integration
- Vehicle tracking system
- Real-time locating system
