= Cisco Meraki =

American cloud-managed IT company

- Type: Division
- Industry: Networking, IT
- Founded: 2006; 20 years ago in Mountain View, California, U.S.
- Founders: Sanjit Biswas; John Bicket; Hans Robertson
- Headquarters: San Francisco, California, U.S.
- Key people: Lawrence Huang (SVP, GM)
- Parent: Cisco Systems
- Website: meraki.cisco.com

Cisco Meraki is a cloud-managed IT company headquartered in San Francisco, California. It provides wireless, enterprise mobility management (EMM) and security cameras, all centrally managed from the web. Meraki was acquired by Cisco Systems in December 2012.

== History ==
Meraki was founded by Sanjit Biswas and John Bicket, along with Hans Robertson. The company was based in part on the MIT Roofnet project, an experimental 802.11b/g mesh network developed by the Computer Science and Artificial Intelligence Laboratory at the Massachusetts Institute of Technology.

Meraki was funded by Google and Sequoia Capital. The organization started in Mountain View, California, in 2006, before relocating to San Francisco. Meraki employed people who worked on the MIT Roofnet project.

On November 18, 2012, Cisco Systems announced it would acquire Meraki for an estimated $1.2 billion.

=== Customer data loss incident ===
On August 3, 2017, the engineering team made changes to the North American object storage service; the change caused some deletion of customer data. Cisco stated that the change was due to the application of "an erroneous policy". The data loss mostly affected media files uploaded by customers. Lost data included:

- Systems Manager – Custom enterprise apps and contact images.
- Meraki Communications – IVR audio files, hold music, contact images and VM greetings.
- Wireless Device Dashboard – Custom floor plans, device placement photos, custom logos used for interface branding and reports and custom splash themes.

On August 7 Meraki announced that some data on the cache service could be recovered. On August 9 customers were informed that recovery efforts were still underway but that they "do not expect to be able to recover most assets".

== Products ==
=== Switches (MS) ===
Series	Deployment type	Interfaces	Uplinks	PoE capabilities	Power configuration	Stacking capabilities	Routing capabilities	Models
MS225	Branch & small campus	24 / 48 x 1GbE RJ45	4 x SFP+ Fixed	370W (LP model) 740W (FP model)	Internal	Yes, 80G physical + virtual	DHCP Relay	MS225-24-HW MS225-24P-HW MS225-48-HW MS225-48LP-HW MS225-48FP-HW
MS450	10G fiber aggregation	12x 40GbE QSFP+	2 x 100GbE QSFP28	N/A	Modular Redundant PSU optional (sold separately)	Front-port 160G + virtual	Static + Dynamic DHCP Server + Relay Warm spare (VRRP)	MS450-12-HW

=== Security Appliances (MX) ===
Table of Meraki MX Security Appliances
Model	Wifi Model	Interfaces	Stateful Firewall Throughput	Architecture	CPU Speed	End of Sale	End of support
Z1	Yes	5 x GbE	50 Mbit/s				
Z3	Yes	5 x GbE	100 Mbit/s				
Z4	Yes	WAN: 1 x GbE RJ45 LAN: 4 x GbE RJ45 (1 x PoE)	500 Mbit/s				
MX60	MX60W	5 x GbE	100 Mbit/s				
MX64	MX64W	WAN: 1 x GbE RJ45 LAN: 4 x GbE RJ45	250 Mbit/s			July 26, 2022	July 26, 2027

== See also ==
- Cisco Systems
- List of networking hardware vendors
