= GPS tracking unit =

Device using satellite navigation to determine geolocation

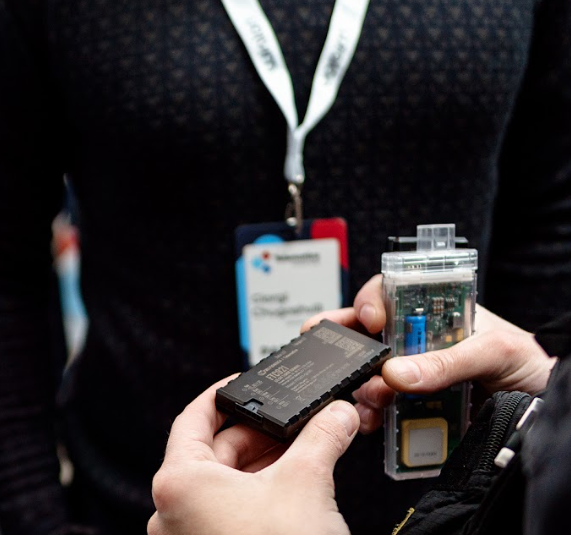
Examples of GPS tracking hardware, one with a transparent case to show internal components.

A GPS tracking unit, commonly referred to as a GPS tracker or simply a tracker, is a device used as part of a tracking system to track the location of the asset it is connected to. It uses a Global Navigation Satellite System (GNSS) to determine its geographic position. This location data, along with other vehicle or asset telemetry, is transmitted to an Internet-connected device or a central server using an embedded cellular, radio, or satellite modem. This enables the real-time monitoring and management of vehicles, assets, personnel, and animals from a remote location, and is used in intelligent transportation systems. The global market was valued at over $2.5 billion in 2022 and is projected to grow at a CAGR of over 13% to reach $4.76 billion by 2027.

GPS tracking units are used by consumers and are a component of fleet telematics systems and fleet digitalization. Data collected by these devices is typically sent to specialized fleet management software platforms. While many modern vehicles are equipped with a factory-installed telematic control unit (TCU) from the manufacturer, aftermarket GPS tracking units are used to manage mixed fleets (with vehicles from different brands) and to equip vehicles that lack native telematics systems. Specialized hardware manufacturers produce these devices.

== Technology and components ==
A modern GPS tracking unit integrates several key electronic components to determine and transmit its location and other data. The core architecture consists of:

- GNSS receiver: The primary component is a receiver that acquires signals from satellite constellations (such as GPS, GLONASS, or Galileo) to calculate the device's precise geographic coordinates.
- Communications module: To transmit its data, the unit contains a modem. The type of modem determines the network coverage:
  - Cellular: Most trackers use a cellular modem (utilizing GSM, GPRS, LTE, or 5G networks) to send data to a central server.
  - Satellite: For use in remote areas without reliable cellular coverage, some devices use a satellite modem and communicate via satellite constellations like Globalstar or Iridium.
- Microcontroller: A central processor manages the system, processing the location data from the GNSS receiver and controlling the communications module and other components. It relies on foundational electronic components like transistors to manage the device's circuits and control its switching functions.
- Memory: Onboard memory is used to store location data, either for temporary buffering when the device is outside of network coverage to prevent data loss, or for logging a complete journey history.
- Power source: Devices are powered either by an internal rechargeable battery for portable applications or by a direct connection to the electrical system of a vehicle for permanent installations.
- Additional components: To support a wider range of applications, many trackers include additional hardware:
  - Accelerometers and gyroscopes: These sensors are used to detect movement, orientation, and events like harsh braking, acceleration, or impacts.
  - Inputs/outputs (I/O): These allow the tracker to connect to and control external accessories or read data from vehicle sensors. This can include monitoring a door opening, reading a temperature sensor, or remotely activating a starter interrupt to immobilize a vehicle.
  - Cameras: Many modern systems integrate dashcams to provide visual context, a practice known as video telematics.

== Types ==
GPS tracking units can be categorised by their primary application and form factor. While most modern devices transmit their location in real time (a function known as data "pushing"), some specialized units may only log their position history for later download (data "logging"). The main distinction is between devices designed for personal/asset use and those designed for vehicle integration.

=== Personal and asset trackers ===
Personal and asset trackers are typically small, portable, battery-powered devices designed to track people, animals, or high-value mobile assets. Their compact size allows them to be carried, attached to equipment, or fitted to a pet's collar.

Common applications include:

- Personal Safety: Used for monitoring the location of children, the elderly, or vulnerable individuals. Many devices include an SOS button that can send an alert and location to a caregiver.
- Lone worker Safety: These devices provide location data and panic alerts for employees in remote or hazardous environments.
- Asset tracking: Used to track mobile assets like shipping containers, generators, and other non-powered equipment.
- Animal Tracking: Placed on pets or wildlife to monitor their location and movement patterns.

=== Vehicle trackers ===
Vehicle trackers are devices designed for installation in vehicles such as cars, trucks, motorcycles, buses for public transport, and heavy machinery. The commercial vehicle segment is the largest end-user of GPS tracking devices, driven by the need for real-time fleet monitoring and management. These devices are a core component of modern fleet management systems and are often referred to as automatic vehicle location (AVL) systems. The global market for this hardware is served by numerous specialized manufacturers, with companies like CalAmp, ORBCOMM, Queclink, and Teltonika among the leading suppliers.

Vehicle trackers can be further categorized by their installation method:

==== Hardwired trackers ====
Hardwired trackers are wired directly into a vehicle's electrical system, providing a constant and reliable power source. This installation allows for deep integration, enabling the tracker to monitor ignition status, control a starter interrupt for vehicle immobilization, and connect to a wide range of third-party sensors to monitor variables such as fuel level, cargo temperature, and tire pressure. They can often connect directly to the vehicle's CAN bus to read detailed operational data. This type is most commonly used in professional fleet digitalization for commercial vehicles.

==== OBD plug-in trackers ====
OBD plug-in trackers are designed for simple installation by connecting directly into a vehicle's OBD-II port. This connection method requires no special tools. In addition to providing location data, OBD trackers can read a wide range of diagnostic information from the onboard computer, including engine RPM, fuel level, and Diagnostic Trouble Codes (DTCs), which are useful for maintenance purposes.

==== Battery-powered trackers ====
Battery-powered trackers are self-contained, wireless devices that operate on their own long-life batteries. This design provides flexibility in placement, as they can be attached to any vehicle or asset without requiring wiring. They are often used for tracking non-powered assets like trailers and containers, or for covert security applications.

== Applications ==
The use of GPS tracking units is widespread across commercial, governmental, and personal applications. While the technology is the same, the implementation and goals vary significantly by use case.

=== Commercial applications ===
The largest application for GPS tracking units is in the commercial sector, where devices are installed in vehicles and equipment to provide real-time data to a central software platform.

==== Fleet management ====
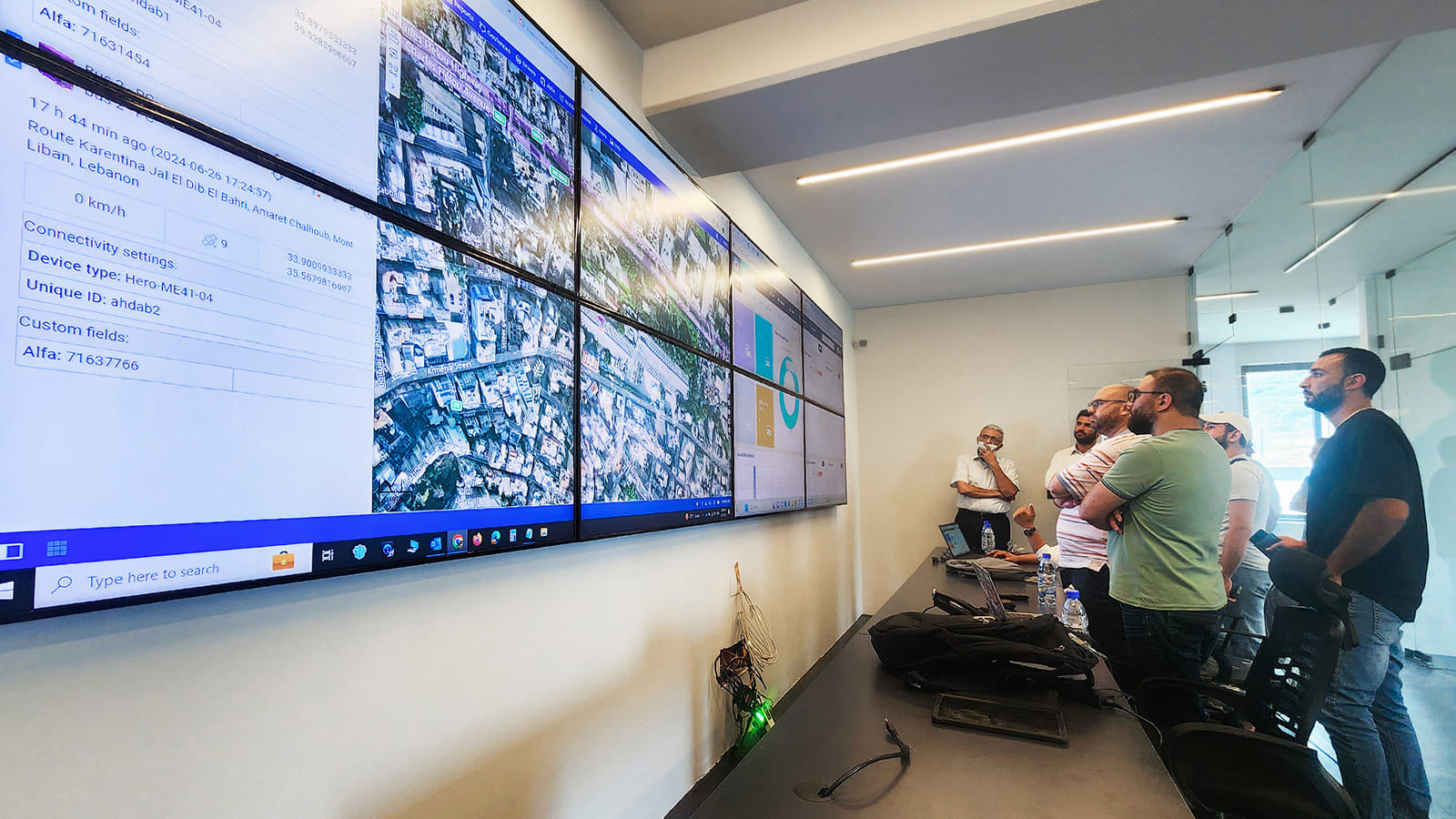
Real-time fleet management control room

In commercial fleet management, GPS tracking is a key component of fleet digitalization. It enables a wide range of functions:

- Operational Efficiency: Monitoring vehicle location to optimize routes, dispatching, and delivery schedules. In humanitarian aid operations, this data is also used to enhance operational visibility and increase the cost-effectiveness of fleets to ensure donor funds are used efficiently.
- Driver Safety and Performance: Tracking behaviors such as speeding, harsh braking, and idling to enable driver coaching and reduce accident rates.
- Maintenance: Using mileage and engine hour data to automate preventative maintenance schedules.

These systems are also crucial for security, helping to prevent gasoline theft and providing data for comprehensive fuel-management systems.

==== Precision agriculture ====
GPS tracking is a core technology in modern precision agriculture, used to improve the efficiency and productivity of farm operations. Trackers are installed on tractors and other farm machinery to:

- Monitor Location and Status: Providing real-time information on the location and operational status of agricultural machinery.
- Enable Parallel Driving: Assisting operators in creating precise, parallel driving paths to avoid overlap and gaps during field work like planting and spraying.
- Control Fuel Consumption: Tracking fuel usage across different machines and tasks to identify inefficiencies.

==== Asset and equipment tracking ====
This application involves placing battery-powered trackers on mobile assets that are non-powered or intermittently powered.

- Trailers and Containers: Logistics companies use trackers to monitor the location of trailers and shipping containers.
- Construction Equipment: Tracking the location of valuable machinery like generators and excavators helps prevent theft and manage inventory across job sites.

=== Vehicle security and recovery ===
A primary use for both consumers and businesses is vehicle security, an application often referred to as stolen vehicle recovery (SVR). In this application, a covertly installed tracker provides the vehicle's location to the owner or law enforcement in the event of a theft. The demand for SVR solutions is particularly strong in regions and emerging markets where vehicle crime rates are a significant problem. Some systems, like LoJack, are specifically designed for vehicle recovery.

=== Personal safety and tracking ===
Compact, battery-powered trackers are widely used for personal safety.

- Vulnerable Persons: Devices are used to monitor the location of children or elderly family members with conditions like dementia, often including an SOS button to call for help.
- Lone Worker and Field Staff Safety: Employers, including humanitarian aid organizations, use these devices to monitor and protect employees who work in remote, isolated, or high-risk environments.
- Sports and Recreation: Hikers, skiers, and other outdoor enthusiasts use trackers to share their location with family or to call for rescue in an emergency.
- Animal Tracking: GPS collars are used to track pets and for scientific studies of wild animal migration patterns.

=== Sporting events ===
Organisers of cycling and running competitions held on open courses issue GPS tracking units to competitors so that their positions can be followed in real time by officials, broadcasters and the public. Where a course runs for hundreds or thousands of kilometres through terrain that spectators cannot reach, the tracker is often the only means by which the event can be watched as it happens. In professional road cycling, Amaury Sport Organisation introduced live rider tracking at the 2015 Tour de France in partnership with the technology company Dimension Data. A transmitter mounted on the saddle rails of each bicycle reports the rider's position and speed, which are used to generate television graphics showing the gaps between riders and groups and to feed a public live-tracking website. The devices do not use cellular networks. Instead they relay data by radio to the helicopters and aircraft that carry the race's television signal, and the transmitters on the bicycles form a wireless network in which television motorcycles and other machines forward data on behalf of riders who have no direct line of sight. In ultra-distance and self-supported racing the same technology serves a different purpose. Competitors in events such as the Transcontinental Race carry a tracker on the bicycle that uploads a position every few minutes to a public map. Following those positions has become an established spectator practice known as "dotwatching", in which each competitor appears as a moving dot on the map. The recorded trace also serves as evidence of compliance with the rules: in the Transcontinental Race a rider is responsible for maintaining the tracker's signal, and must otherwise gather separate proof that the ride was completed within the rules. Trackers are also carried for safety, allowing organisers to locate a competitor who stops or leaves the course, and trail and mountain running events commonly list one among the equipment a runner is required to carry. Carrying a device does not by itself guarantee help. At the Gansu ultramarathon disaster of May 2021, in which 21 competitors died of hypothermia, a GPS tracker was on the race's list of mandatory equipment, and commentary afterwards held the organisers responsible for failing to provide adequate rescue and safety cover.

== Legislation and privacy ==
The use of GPS tracking is regulated by laws that vary significantly by jurisdiction. The legal framework generally balances the right to monitor one's own property with an individual's right to privacy. Key legal considerations often depend on who is performing the tracking (government vs. private citizen) and whether the person being tracked has given consent.

=== European Union ===
In the European Union, the General Data Protection Regulation (GDPR) is the primary law governing GPS tracking. Under GDPR, location data is considered personal data, meaning its collection and processing require a valid legal basis.

For commercial fleets, this has several implications:

- Employee Monitoring: Companies must typically obtain explicit consent from employees to track their vehicles, especially if the vehicle is used for personal time. Alternatively, a company may argue "legitimate interest," but this requires a careful balancing act to ensure the monitoring is proportionate and necessary for business purposes, such as safety or logistics, and does not unduly infringe on the employee's privacy.
- Data Transparency: Companies must be transparent with individuals about what data is being collected and how it is being used.

=== United States ===
In the United States, the law distinguishes between government use and private use of GPS trackers.

==== Government use ====
The use of GPS trackers by law enforcement is limited by the Fourth Amendment to the United States Constitution. In the landmark 2018 case Carpenter v. United States, the Supreme Court ruled that accessing historical cell-site location information (CSLI) constitutes a Fourth Amendment search, and thus generally requires a warrant. This ruling built upon the 2012 case United States v. Jones, which held that attaching a GPS tracker to a suspect's vehicle also constitutes a search requiring a warrant.

==== Private use ====
The use of GPS trackers by private citizens is regulated at the state level, and many states have specific laws against electronic surveillance without consent. For example, California Penal Code Section 637.7 makes it a misdemeanor to use an electronic tracking device to determine the location or movement of a person, with an exception for when the owner of the vehicle has consented. Other laws related to stalking, harassment, and invasion of privacy may also apply.

=== Other jurisdictions ===
Laws in other countries often follow similar principles. In Australia, for example, the use of tracking devices is regulated by state-level workplace surveillance acts, such as the Workplace Surveillance Act 2005 in New South Wales, which generally require that employees be notified that tracking is in place.

== Uses in marketing ==
In August 2010, Brazilian company Unilever ran a promotion in which GPS trackers were placed in boxes of Omo laundry detergent. Teams would then track consumers who purchased the boxes of detergent to their homes where they would be awarded a prize for their purchase. The company also launched a website (in Portuguese) to show the approximate location of the winners' homes.

== See also ==
- Automatic Packet Reporting System
- Data privacy
- Electronic tagging
- GPS navigation device
- GPS watch
- GPS wildlife tracking
- Fleet management
- Intelligent transportation system (ITS)
- IVMS
- Mobile phone
- Moving map display
- Real-time locating
- Telematics
- Vehicle infrastructure integration
- Vehicle tracking system
