= Gurtam =

- Type: Private company
- Industry: Software; Telecommunication; Telematics; IoT
- Founded: 2002
- Headquarters: Lithuania, Vilnius
- Number of locations: 5 offices including HQ: Lithuania (Vilnius); Georgia_(country) (Tbilisi); United States (Boston); United Arab Emirates (Dubai); Argentina (Buenos Aires)
- Key people: Aliaksei Shchurko (Co-Founder, Chief Gurtam Architect); Denis Strakh (Co-founder, Head of Development Center); Aliaksandr Kuushynau (Chief Wialon Officer, Head of Wialon Division)
- Number of employees: 300 (2022)

Gurtam (Belarusian “гуртам” — together) is a developer and provider of software for GPS monitoring, vehicle telematics and fleet management.

As of September 2021, Wialon, the GPS tracking system developed by Gurtam, monitored more than 3 000 000 assets worldwide. The company's business network involves over 2,200 fleet management service providers in more than 130 countries. According to the report of Berg Insight research agency, Wialon is the leading GPS monitoring system in CIS, occupying about 40% of the CIS commercial carrier market.

== Operations ==
The most popular Gurtam services are Wialon Hosting (SaaS) and Wialon Local (server-based solution).

Gurtam constantly participates in industrial expos and events worldwide including CeBIT, GSMA Mobile World Congress, Securex South Africa, Expo Seguridad Mexico, CTIA, GITEX, Telematics Conference SE Europe etc.

== History ==
Date	Event
2002–2004	First steps in the development of software for vehicle satellite monitoring systems in cooperation with AtlantMotors Volkswagen dealer in Minsk and BelRadioPaige paging company.
February 2015	400 000 units worldwide are registered in Wialon Data Center.
November 2016	The number of units in Wialon system reached 1 000 000 worldwide.
December 2016	A new office is launched in Buenos Aires.
March 2017	Gurtam released a PaaS back-end platform flespi.
May 2019	The 2,000,000th unit is connected to Wialon.
April 2020	COVID-19 IoT Alliance launch. The project helps national governments, municipalities, NGOs, and other groups harness the spread of the coronavirus.
June 2020	Gurtam establishes the IoT project of the year, the first global annual competition of IoT projects focused on telematics solutions.

== Random facts ==
In 2009, the company provided Wialon software for vehicle tracking at the international automobile race “A National Sport – Bridge of Friendship”. Further on the company cooperates with other automobile racing coordinators, including those engaged in “Beijing-Paris” multi-stage rally, Can-Am Trophy Russia open off-road ATV-series, “Ukraine Trophy 2012” trophy-raid.

In 2014, Gurtam arranged Kilimanjaro expedition to test hardware and proprietary tracking system in extreme conditions. According to Berg Insight market research agency, Wialon was recognized a leading satellite monitoring system in the CIS and the Russian Federation in 2014 and 2015.

Since July 2021 Gurtam has joined the IoT M2M Council (IMC) as a Sustaining Member company.
