= Fleet management software =

Fleet management software (FMS) is computer software that enables people to accomplish a series of specific tasks in the management of any or all aspects relating to a fleet of vehicles operated by a company, government, or other organisation. These specific tasks encompass all operations from vehicle acquisition through maintenance to disposal.

Fleet management software systems are based on mathematical models and computation techniques in order to optimize and simulate transport fleets' management.

== Fleet management software functions ==
The main function of fleet management software is to accumulate, store, process, monitor, report on and export information. Information can be imported from external sources such as gas pump processors, territorial authorities for managing vehicle registration (for example DVLA and VOSA), financial institutions, insurance databases, vehicle specification databases, mapping systems and from internal sources such as Human Resources and Finance.

=== Vehicle management ===
Fleet management software should be able to manage processes, tasks and events related to all kinds of vehicles - car, trucks, earth-moving machinery, buses, forklift trucks, trailers and specialist equipment, including:

- Vehicle inventory - the number and type of vehicles
- Vehicle maintenance - specific routine maintenance and scheduled maintenance, and ad hoc requirements
- Licensing, registration, MOT and tax
- Vehicle insurance including due dates and restrictions
- Cost management and analysis
- Vehicle disposal

=== Driver management ===
- Driver license management, including special provisions
- Logging of penalty points and infringements against a licence
- Booking system for pool vehicles
- Passenger safety (SOS)

=== Incident management ===
- Accidents and fines, plus apportioning costs to drivers

=== Tracking ===
- Telematics
- Route planning
- Logbooks and work time
- Alerts

== Fleet management metrics to track ==
- Identification Metrics such as vehicle ID, company ID, location ID, Driver ID
- Utilization Metrics such as mileage and fuel data
- Behavioral Metrics like average speed and harsh acceleration
- Trip Metrics like number of trips, average duration
- Maintenance Metrics like maintenance costs and number of diagnostics

== Software procurement and development ==
Fleet management software can be developed in-house by the company or organisation using it, or be purchased from a third party. It varies greatly in its complexity and cost.

Fleet management software is directly related to fleet management. It originated on mainframe computers in the 1970s and shifted to the personal computers in the 1980s when it became practical. In later years however, Fleet Management Software has been more efficiently provided as SaaS. Fleet management software has become increasingly necessary and complex as increasing amounts of vehicle related legislation has been brought in.

== See also ==
- Vehicle tracking
