= Telematic control unit =

Automobile telemetry system

In the automotive industry, a telematic control unit (TCU) is the embedded system on board a vehicle that wirelessly connects the vehicle to cloud services or other vehicles via V2X standards over a cellular network. The TCU collects telemetry data from the vehicle, such as position, speed, engine data, connectivity quality, etc., from various sub-systems over data and control busses. It may also provide in-vehicle connectivity via Wifi and Bluetooth and implements the eCall function when applicable.

A TCU consists of:

- A satellite navigation (GNSS) unit, which keeps track of the latitude and longitude values of the vehicle
- An external interface for mobile communication (GSM, GPRS, Wi-Fi, WiMax, LTE or 5G), which provides the tracked values to a centralized geographical information system (GIS) database server
- An electronic processing unit
- A microcontroller, microprocessor, or field programmable gate array (FPGA) which processes the information and acts as an interface to the GPS
- A mobile communication unit
- Memory for saving GPS values in mobile-free zones or to intelligently store information about the vehicle's sensor data
- A battery module

== See also ==
- Telematics
