= Fleet telematics system =

A fleet telematics system (FTS) allows the information exchange between a commercial vehicle fleet and their central authority, i.e., the dispatching office. A FTS typically consists of mobile Vehicle Systems (VS) and a stationary Fleet Communication System (FCS). The FCS may be a stand-alone application maintained by the motor carrier or an internet service running by the supplier of the system. The FCS usually includes a database in which all vehicle positions and messages are stored.

Digital maps are often included which allow visualization of vehicle positions and traces. Communication with the FCS is realized by trunked radio, cellular, or satellite communication. Positioning of vehicles is usually realized by satellite positioning systems and/or dead reckoning using gyroscope and odometer.

Usually, the VS is equipped with a simple input device allowing drivers to send predefined status messages. Drivers may add simple content, e.g., numeric values, but usually cannot enter arbitrary text. Besides the messages sent by drivers, some VS can also automatically submit messages, e.g., the vehicle's position, data from sensors in the cargo body, or vehicle data from the CAN-bus and/or SAE J1939.

In 2002, major European commercial vehicle manufacturers, namely Daimler Chrysler, MAN, Scania, DAF, Iveco, Volvo, and Renault, agreed to give third parties access to vehicle data using the CAN-bus as a connection. The Fleet Management System is an open standard allowing, dependent on the vehicle equipment, access to vehicle data such as fuel consumption, engine data, or vehicle weight.

== See also ==
- Fleet digitalization
- Fleet management
- GPS tracking
- Real-time locating system
- Telematics
- Vehicle tracking system
