= Fleet digitalization =

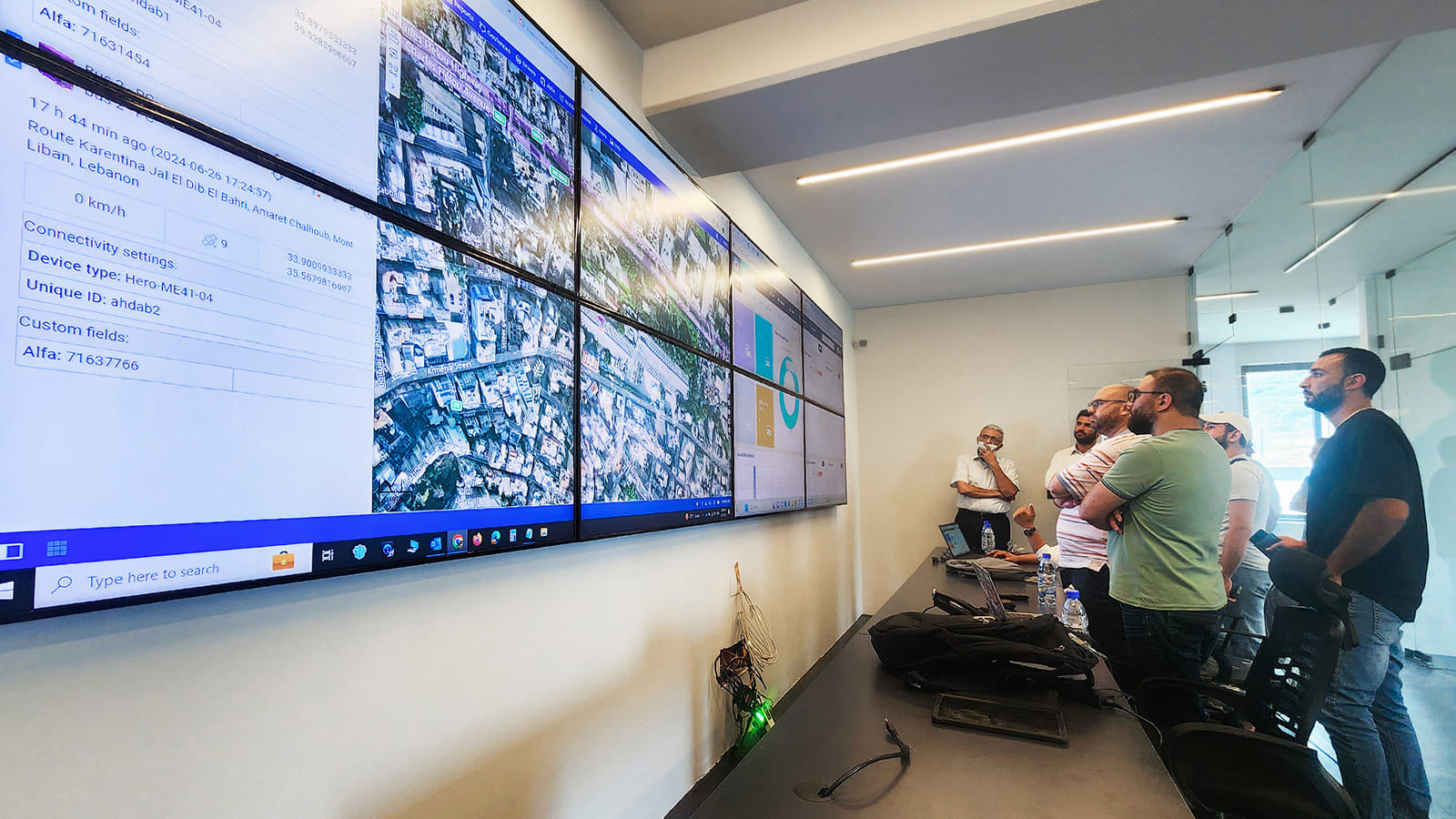
A control center where staff monitor the real-time location and operational data of a vehicle fleet on a video wall

Fleet digitalization is the use of digital technologies to change a business model and provide new revenue and value to improve fleet management.

Advanced fleet digitalization solutions are often built on the base of telematics and fleet management platforms tailored to different sectors and industries. It allows fleets to get better operational results, including enhanced efficiency, improved driving behavior, reduced fuel consumption, theft prevention and operating costs.
