= Fleet management =

Strategies for managing commercial vehicles

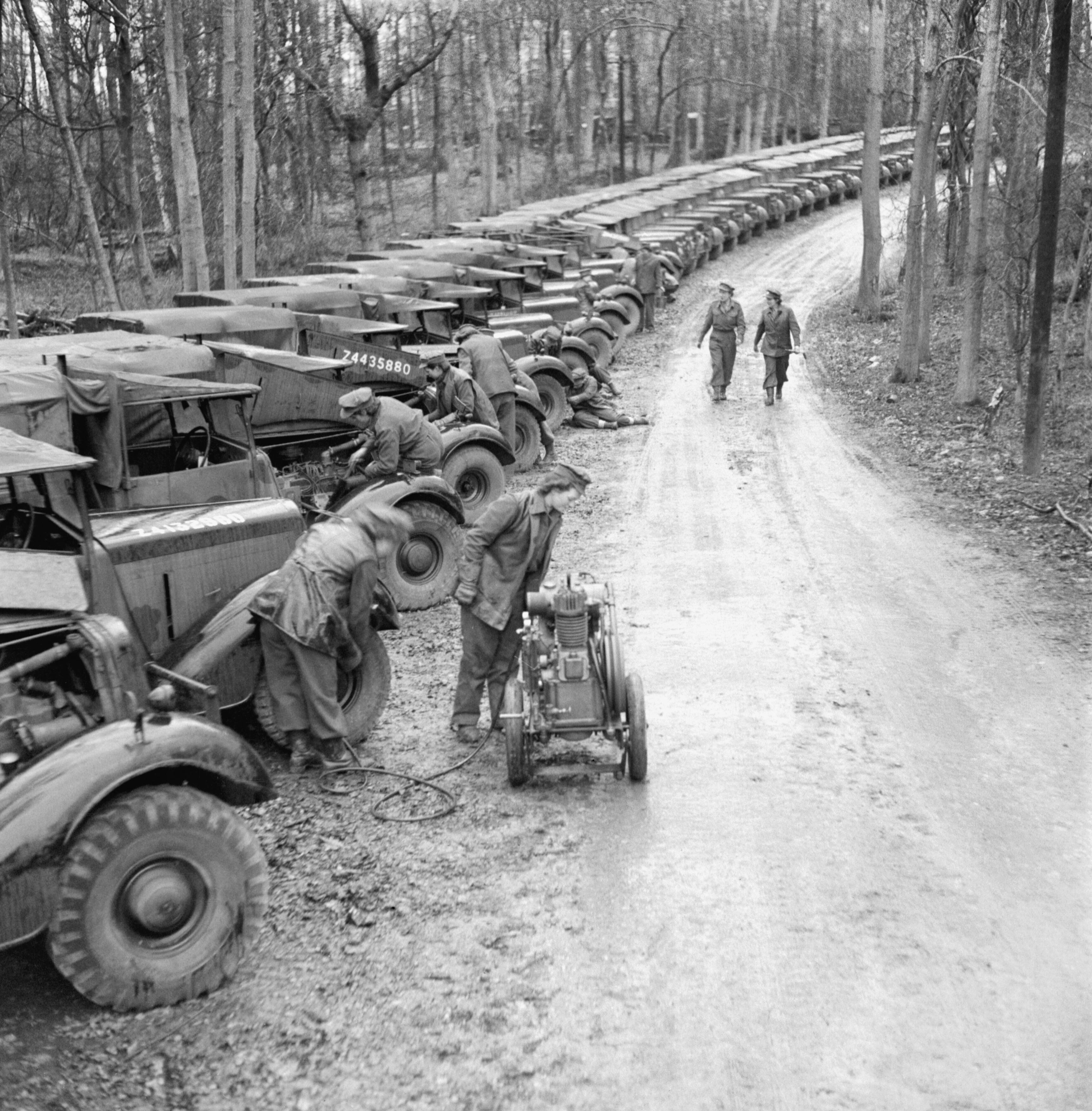
Members of the Auxiliary Territorial Service servicing fleet vehicles at Chilwell Ordnance Depot in Nottinghamshire, 1944, in advance of the Normandy landings

Fleet management is the management of:

- Commercial motor vehicles such as cars, vans, trucks, specialist vehicles (such as mobile construction machinery), forklifts, and trailers
- Private vehicles used for work purposes (the 'grey fleet')
- Aviation machinery such as aircraft (planes and helicopters)
- Ships
- Rail cars
- Non-powered assets such as generators, tanks, gear boxes, dumpsters, shipping containers, trailers, excavators, and other equipment that can't run on its own power.

Fleet (vehicle) management can include a range of functions, such as vehicle leasing and financing, vehicle maintenance, licensing and compliance, supply chain management, accident management and subrogation, vehicle telematics (tracking and diagnostics), driver management, speed management, fuel management, health and safety management, and vehicle re-marketing. Fleet Management is a function which allows companies which rely on transportation in business to remove or minimize the risks associated with vehicle investment, improving efficiency, productivity and reducing their overall transportation and staff costs, providing 100% compliance with government legislation (duty of care) and many more. These functions can be dealt with by either an in-house fleet-management department or an outsourced fleet-management provider. The number of light duty vehicles registered in commercial fleets in Europe as of 2016 was 15 million, and 19.5 million in North America. Even with these record numbers of registration, light duty vehicles represent only 62% of all fleet sales. Berg Insight estimated about 19.2 million active telematics-based fleet management systems in North America and 18.1 million in Europe at the end of 2024, forecast to reach 33.2 million and 30.5 million respectively by 2029.

== Overview of fleet management integration ==
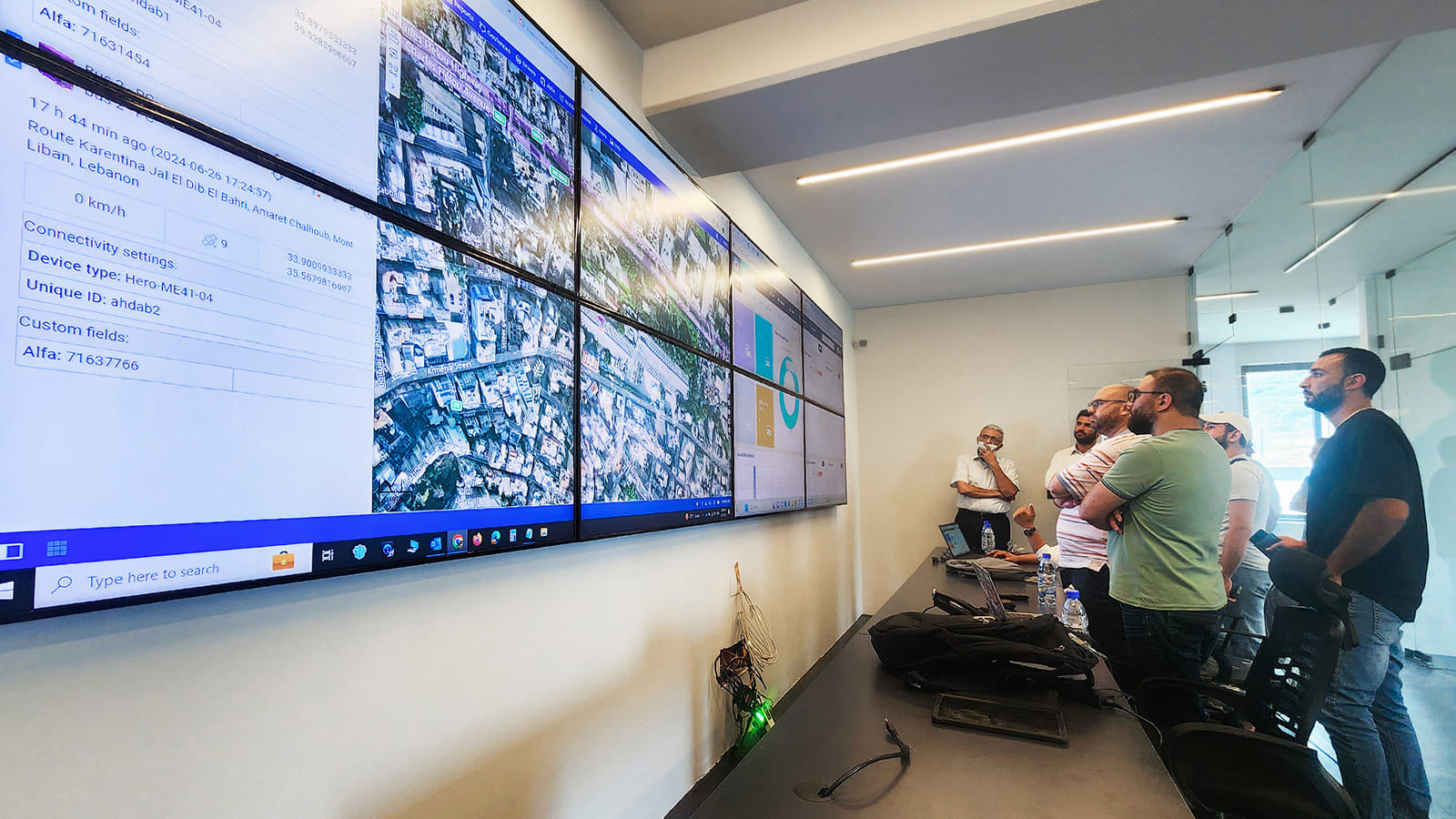
Fleet management control room displaying real-time vehicle locations and operational data.

The range of functions involved in fleet management are highly interrelated and generally integrated. While some services and products can be engaged separately, an overall system that integrates the data from various functions is required for optimal performance. Vehicle tracking systems provide a number of data points regarding engine diagnostics, driving behaviors, and geo-location. But there are a multitude of other data points outside of vehicle tracking systems that significantly impact fleet performance. Fuel transaction data, maintenance repair data, individual vehicle documents such as vehicle registrations, titles, and travel permits, supply chain data including vehicle and equipment specifications, warranties, build and delivery data, and vehicle identifying data, and driver-centric data such as acceptance of fleet policies, completion of required safety training, as well as demographic data on job types, all contribute to the fleet data pool. The more specialized functions a fleet performs, the more systems and data points are involved in integration.

== Vehicle tracking system ==
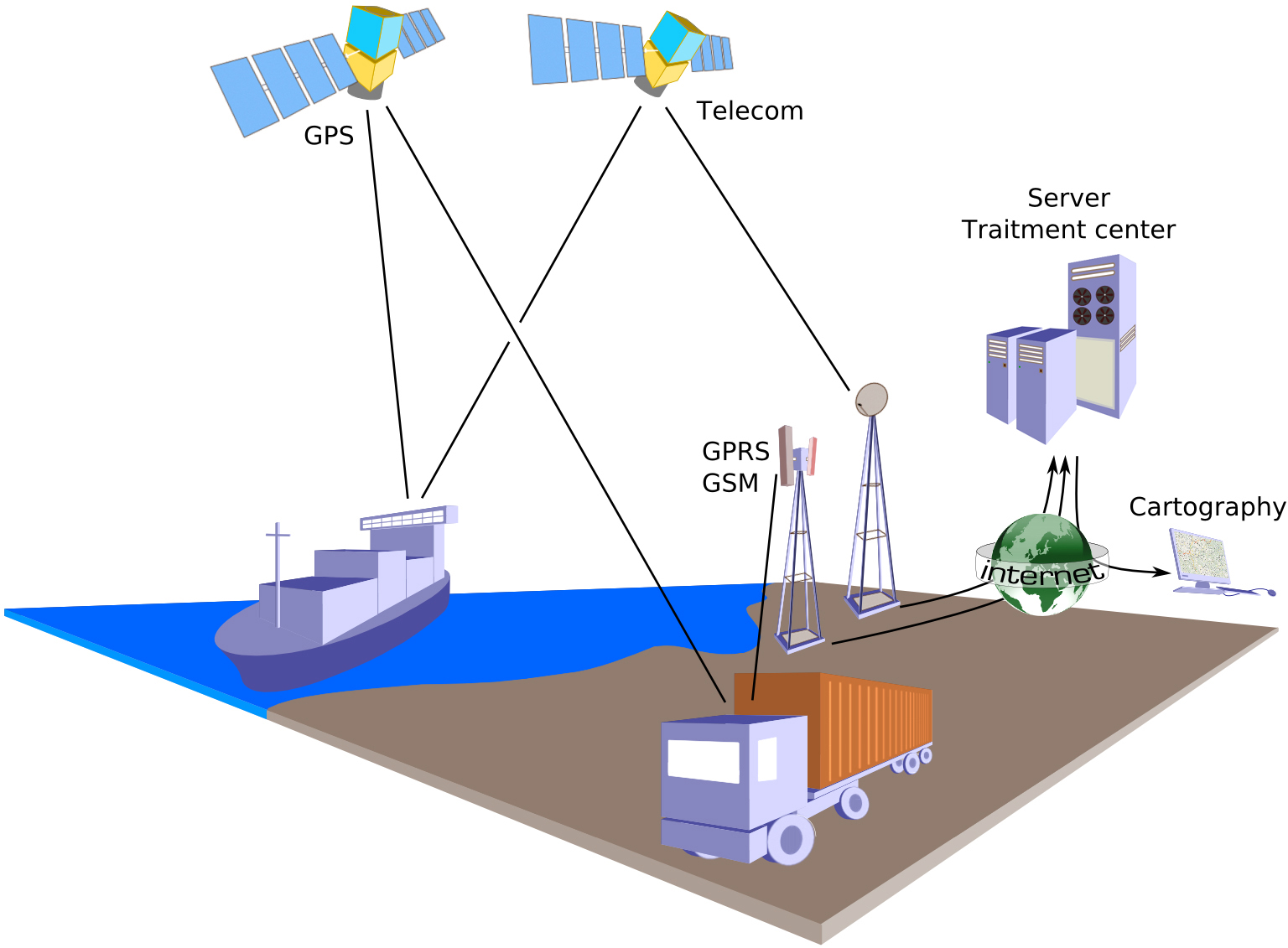
Principle of geolocation based on the GPS for the position determination and the GSM/GPRS or telecommunication satellites network for the data transmission.

A key component in fleet management systems, is the vehicle tracking component. This component is usually GPS-based, but sometimes it can be based on GLONASS or a cellular triangulation platform. Once vehicle location, direction and speed are determined from the GPS components, additional tracking capabilities transmit this information to a fleet management software application. Methods for data transmission include both terrestrial and satellite. Satellite tracking communications, while more expensive, are critical if vehicle tracking is to work in remote environments without interruption. Users can see actual, real-time locations of their fleet on a map. This is often used to quickly respond on events in the field. In the European Union, the Data Act, which came into application in September 2025, requires manufacturers of connected vehicles to provide fleet operators with access to vehicle-generated data, enabling integration with third-party fleet management platforms.

=== Mechanical diagnostics ===
An advanced fleet management systems (FMS) can connect to the vehicle's onboard computer, and gather data for the user. Data such as mileage and fuel consumption are gathered into a global statistics scheme.

=== Driver behavior ===
Highly developed fleet management and vehicle telematics systems collect a full range of data in real-time and for transport and fleet managers. By combining received data from the vehicle tracking system and the on-board computer, it is possible to form a profile for any given driver (average speed, frequency of detours, breaks, severity of manoeuvres, choice of gears, etc.). This data can be used to highlight drivers with dangerous habits and to suggest remedial training applicable to the issues, or to ensure that drivers are meeting KPIs. Fleet management apps have shown to reduce driving incidents.

=== Geo-fencing ===
Geofencing, a key feature in many fleet management and vehicle telematics systems, significantly boosts asset security. It works by creating a virtual geographic boundary around a specific location using mapping technology. When a GPS-enabled device or asset tracker enters or exits this pre-defined area, it triggers an automated alert, which users can receive via text, email, or push notification. This functionality allows for proactive monitoring and immediate response to unauthorized movements.

== Fleet management software ==
Fleet management software enables people to accomplish a series of specific tasks in the management of any or all aspects relating to a company's fleet of vehicles. These specific tasks encompass all operations from vehicle acquisition to disposal. Software, depending on its capabilities, allows functions such as recording driver and vehicle details, the tracking of procurement costs, scheduling of maintenance and servicing tasks, import of fuel transactions, route optimization, and measuring of fleet performance via reports and charts.

== Management of ships ==
Fleet management also refers to the management of ships while at sea. Shipping fleet management contracts are normally given to fleet management companies that handle aspects like crewing, maintenance, and day-to-day operations. This gives the ship owner time to concentrate on cargo booking.

== Fleet security and control ==
Recent advances in fleet management allow for the addition of over-the-air (OTA) security and control of fleet vehicles. Fleet Security and Control includes security of the vehicle while stopped or not in operation and the ability to safely disable a vehicle while in operation. This allows the fleet manager to recover stolen or rogue vehicles while reducing the chance of lost or stolen cargo. The additional of Fleet Security and Control to a fleet management system gives a fleet card manager preventative measures to address cargo damage and loss.

=== Remote vehicle disabling systems ===
Remote vehicle disabling systems provide users at remote locations the ability to prevent an engine from starting, prevent movement of a vehicle, and to stop or slow an operating vehicle. Remote disabling allows a dispatcher or other authorized personnel to gradually decelerate a vehicle by downshifting, limiting the throttle capability, or bleeding air from the braking system from a remote location. Some of these systems provide advance notification to the driver that the vehicle disabling is about to occur. After stopping a vehicle, some systems will lock the vehicle's brakes or will not allow the vehicle's engine to be restarted within a certain time-frame.

Remote disabling systems can also be integrated into a remote panic and emergency notification system. In an emergency, a driver can send an emergency alert by pressing a panic button on the dashboard, or by using a key-fob panic button if the driver is within close proximity of the truck. Then, the carrier or other approved organization can be remotely alerted to allow a dispatcher or other authorized personnel to evaluate the situation, communicate with the driver, and/or potentially disable the vehicle.

== Fleet replacement and lifecycle management ==
The timely replacement of vehicles and equipment is a process that requires the ability to predict asset lifecycles based on costing information, utilization, and asset age. Organizations prefer to use new fleet as a strategy for cost reduction where the used fleet is sold so that a new fleet is maintained.

Funding requirements are also an issue, because many organizations, especially government, purchase vehicles with cash. The ad hoc nature and traditional low funding levels with cash has put many operations in an aged fleet. This lack of adequate funding for replacement can also result in higher maintenance costs due to aged vehicles.

== Duty of care ==
In the UK, in April 2008, the Corporate Manslaughter Act was strengthened to target company directors as well as their drivers in cases of road deaths involving vehicles used on business. The Police have said they now treat every road death as 'an unlawful killing' and have the power to seize company records and computers during their investigations. They will bring prosecutions against company directors who fail to provide clear policies and guidance for their employees driving at work. Unfortunately, in the UK a number of businesses are failing to meet their duty of care. In particular prosecutions can be brought against company directors for failing to meet their duty of care and allowing HGV driver hours to exceed the legal limits. Failure to comply with EU rules can result in a fixed penalty of up to £300, a graduated deposit of up to £1500 or you could be summoned to court. Directors and business owners may not be aware that privately owned vehicles used for business journeys are treated exactly the same as company owned vehicles. Directors have an equal responsibility under the law to ensure these vehicles are also roadworthy and correctly insured. It is vital that every company has a 'Driving at Work' policy in place covering every element of their business vehicle operation, no matter how few vehicles are involved and who owns them. Every employee driving for business is required to sign up to the policy. In this way, the directors can reduce the risk of being prosecuted and a possible custodial sentence.

== See also ==
- Fleet telematics
- Fleet tracking
- GPS tracking
- National Association of Fleet Administrators (NAFA)
- Satellite tracking
- Telematics
- Vehicle remarketing
- Vehicle tracking system
- Fleet management software
