= List of United States insurance companies =

This is a list of insurance companies based in the United States. These are companies with a strong national or regional presence, having insurance as their primary business.

== History ==
In 1752, Benjamin Franklin founded the first American insurance company as Philadelphia Contributionship. In 1820, there were 17 stock life insurance companies in the state of New York, many of which would subsequently fail. Between 1870 and 1872, 33 US life insurance companies failed, in part fueled by bad practices and incidents such as the Great Chicago Fire of 1871. 3,800 property-liability and 2,270 life insurance companies were operating in the United States by 1989.

== U.S. insurance companies ==
=== Property and casualty insurance ===
- 21st Century Insurance
- Acuity Insurance
- Aflac
- Allianz Life
- Allied Insurance
- Allstate
- American Automobile Association (AAA)
- American Family Insurance
- American Income Life Insurance Company
- American International Group (AIG)
- American National Insurance Company
- American Strategic Insurance (ASI)
- Ameriprise Auto & Home Insurance
- Ameriprise Financial
- Ameritas Life Insurance Company
- Amica Mutual Insurance
- Amtrust Financial Services
- Applied Underwriters
- Arbella Insurance Group
- Assurant
- Assurity Life Insurance Company
- Auto-Owners Insurance
- AXA Equitable Life Insurance Company
- Bankers Life and Casualty Company
- Berkshire Hathaway
- Brotherhood Mutual Insurance Company
- Burns & Wilcox
- CareSource
- Chubb Corp
- Citizens Property Insurance Corporation
- CNA Financial
- CNO Financial Group
- Colonial Life & Accident Insurance Company
- Combined Insurance
- Commerce Insurance Group
- Country Financial
- Delta Dental
- Encompass Insurance Company
- Erie Insurance Group
- Esurance
- Evergreen USA RRG
- Farmers Insurance Group
- Federated Mutual Insurance Company
- First Insurance Company of Hawaii
- FM Global
- Fortegra Group
- GAINSCO
- GEICO
- General Re
- Genworth Financial
- Gerber Life Insurance Company
- Globe Life And Accident Insurance Company
- GMAC Insurance
- Gracy Title Company
- Grange Mutual Casualty Company
- The Guardian Life Insurance Company of America
- GuideOne Insurance
- Hagerty Insurance Agency
- Hanover Insurance
- The Hartford
- HCC Insurance Holdings
- Hiscox Small Business Insurance
- Horace Mann Educators Corporation
- Ironshore
- K&K Insurance
- Kansas City Life Insurance Company
- Kemper Corporation
- Knights of Columbus
- Lemonade (insurance)
- Liberty Mutual
- Lincoln National Corporation
- Manhattan Life Insurance Company
- Markel Corporation
- MassMutual
- Merchants Insurance Group
- Mercury Insurance Group
- MetLife
- Metromile
- Modern Woodmen of America
- Mutual of Omaha
- National Flood Insurance Program
- Nationwide Mutual Insurance Company
- New Jersey Manufacturers Insurance Company
- New York Life Insurance Company
- NJM Insurance Group
- The Norfolk & Dedham Group
- Omega
- Oxford Health Plans
- Pacific Life
- PEMCO
- Penn Mutual
- Penn National Insurance
- Philadelphia Contributionship for the Insurance of Houses from Loss by Fire
- Philadelphia Insurance Companies
- Physicians Mutual
- Primerica
- Principal Financial Group
- Progressive
- ProSight Specialty Insurance
- Protective Life
- Prudential Financial
- Pure Insurance
- QBE
- The Regence Group
- Reliance Insurance Company
- Reliance Partners
- RLI Corp.
- Safe Auto Insurance Company
- Safeco
- Safeway Insurance Group
- SageSure
- Securian Financial Group
- Sentry Insurance
- Shelter Insurance
- Society Insurance
- Southern Aid and Insurance Company
- SquareTrade
- Standard Insurance Company
- State Farm Insurance
- Sun Life Financial
- Symetra
- The General
- The Travelers Companies
- TIAA
- Titan Insurance Company
- Transamerica Corporation
- Tricare
- Trupanion
- UPC Insurance
- Unum
- USAA
- West Coast Life
- Western & Southern Financial Group
- Western Mutual Insurance Group
- Westfield Insurance
- White Mountains Insurance Group
- W. R. Berkley Corporation
- XL Catlin
- Zurich Insurance Group

=== Life and annuity ===
- Aflac
- Afro-American Life Insurance Company
- Allianz Life
- Allstate
- American Family Insurance
- American Fidelity Assurance
- American Income Life Insurance Company
- Ameritas Life Insurance Company
- Amica Mutual Insurance
- Assurity Life Insurance Company
- AXA Equitable Life Insurance Company
- Bankers Life and Casualty
- Banner Life Insurance Company
- Central Life Insurance Company of Florida
- Colonial Life & Accident Insurance Company
- Colonial Penn
- Conseco
- Farmers Insurance Group
- Genworth Financial
- The Great-West Life Assurance Company
- Gerber Life Insurance Company
- Globe Life And Accident Insurance Company
- The Guardian Life Insurance Company of America
- Horace Mann Educators Corporation
- ING Group
- Jackson National Life
- John Hancock Life Insurance
- Kansas City Life Insurance Company
- Lincoln National Corporation
- Manhattan Life Insurance Company
- MEGA Life and Health Insurance
- MetLife
- Mutual of Omaha
- National Life Group
- National Western Life Insurance Company
- Nationwide Mutual Insurance Company
- New York Life Insurance Company
- Northwestern Mutual
- Ohio National Financial Services Company
- Pacific Life
- Physicians Mutual
- Primerica
- Protective Life
- Prudential Financial
- Securian Financial Group
- Standard Insurance Company
- State Farm Insurance
- Thrivent
- TIAA-CREF
- Transamerica Corporation
- UNIFI Companies
- United of Omaha
- Western & Southern Financial Group

=== Health insurance (major medical insurance) ===
- AARP
- Aetna
- American National Insurance Company
- Amerigroup
- Blue Cross and Blue Shield Association
- Bright Health
- CareSource
- Cambia Health Solutions
- Centene Corporation
- Cigna
- Compass Rose Benefits Group
- Delta Dental
- Elevance Health
- EmblemHealth
- Fallon Health
- Geisinger
- Golden Rule Insurance Company
- Harvard Pilgrim Health Care
- Health Care Service Corporation
- Health Net
- HealthMarkets
- HealthPartners
- Highmark
- Humana
- Independence Blue Cross
- Kaiser Permanente
- Kaleida Health
- MassHealth
- Medical Mutual of Ohio
- Molina Healthcare
- Oscar Health
- Oxford Health Plans
- Premera Blue Cross
- Principal Financial Group
- Thrivent Financial for Lutherans
- UnitedHealth Group
- Unitrin
- WellCare

==== Medicare ====
- Aetna
- American Family Insurance
- Bankers Life and Casualty
- CareSource
- Conseco
- Fidelis Care
- Kaiser Permanente
- Mutual of Omaha
- Physicians Mutual
- Premera Blue Cross
- Thrivent Financial for Lutherans
- United American Insurance Company

=== Workers' compensation ===
- Accident Fund Insurance Company of America
- American International Group (AIG)
- AmTrust Financial Services
- Cincinnati Financial Corporation
- Erie Insurance Group
- GUARD Insurance Group
- Hanover Insurance
- The Hartford
- Liberty Mutual
- Merchants Insurance Group
- Missouri Employers Mutual
- Nationwide Mutual Insurance Company
- New York State Insurance Fund
- The Norfolk & Dedham Group
- Penn National Insurance
- Puerto Rico State Insurance Fund
- Sentry Insurance
- Society Insurance
- State Farm Insurance
- State Compensation Insurance Fund
- United Heartland
- Zenith Insurance Group

== See also ==
- Insurance in the United States
- List of Canadian insurance companies
- List of health insurance chief executive officers in the United States
