= Jack Salzwedel =

American business executive

Jack Charles Salzwedel is board chair of American Family Insurance, retiring as chief executive officer on Dec. 31, 2021, a role he held since November 2011.

== Education ==
Salzwedel was born in DeForest, Wisconsin. He earned a bachelor's degree in biology and business administration from Wartburg College in Waverly, Iowa. While there, he was a student representative on the board of regents.

== Career ==
He started his career after college with American Family Insurance in 1983 as a claims adjuster. He became an agent in 1985 and a district sales manager in 1988. In 1995, he became a state sales director of Wisconsin East. Then, in the year 2000, he became vice president of the Personal Lines Division and then vice president of the Life/Health Division in 2003. In 2004, he was elected as the executive vice president and in 2006 he became the company COO. By 2007, he was the president and COO of American Family Mutual. Finally, in November 2011 he was elected as the chairman and CEO.

As CEO, Salzwedel has overseen:

- The 2012 acquisition of The General Insurance.
- The 2013 acquisition of Homesite Insurance.
- The inaugural jersey sponsor of the 2017 MLS expansion team Atlanta United FC
- The 2017 partnership with Milwaukee World Festival Inc. to become the first presenting sponsor of Summerfest in Milwaukee.
- The 2017 acquisitions of HomeGauge® and Networked Insights.
- The 2018 merger with Main Street America.
- The 2019 agreement with the Milwaukee Brewers to rename Miller Park, American Family Field after the 2020 season.
- The 2021 commitment of $105 million to reducing equity gaps.

Salzwedel is considered "the most engaged Fortune 500 CEO on Twitter" as @AmFamJack. In 2017, he earned first place in the “Executive Visibility” category of PR Daily's Media Relations Awards. He also blogs frequently on a variety of topics.

== Boards ==
Salzwedel is co-chair of the American Family Children's Hospital advisory board. He also serves on a number of industry trade organization boards, including the Property Casualty Insurers Association of America, the Insurance Institute for High Safety, and the Insurance Information Institute.

== Personal life ==
Salzwedel is married. He and his wife, Sarah, received the 2018 United Way of Dane County Tocqueville Society Award. The couple established the Slife Institute for Social Work Consultation, Research and Training at Wartburg College in Waverly, Iowa, where they met.
