= Lytx =

American technology company that designs, manufactures and sells video telematics

- Type: Private
- Industry: Video telematics, Fleet management, Fleet safety, Driver safety programs, Fuel management, Vehicle tracking, vehicle telematics
- Founded: 1998
- Headquarters: San Diego, California, United States
- Key people: Chris Cabrera (CEO)
- Products: Lytx DriveCam Event Recorder, Driver Safety Program, Risk Detection Service, Fleet Tracking Service, Lytx Compliance Services, Surfsight dashcam
- Number of employees: 1,082 (2025)
- Website: www.lytx.com

Lytx is a San Diego, California based technology company that designs, manufactures and sells video telematics products used by commercial and public-sector fleets to help improve driver safety and business productivity. Products include risk detection, fleet tracking, and driver safety programs that use artificial intelligence and analysts to identify risky driving behaviors and report real-time automatic vehicle location data. The company's clients include waste management and sanitation companies, trucking and distribution, government and municipality vehicles, passenger transit, construction, utilities, telecom and field services. Lytx also provides compliance services for trucking fleets regulated by the U.S. Department of Transportation.

== History ==
=== Founding ===
Lytx, formerly DriveCam, Inc., was founded in 1998 by Gary Rayner. Rayner wanted a version of a "flight recorder" that could identify the root cause of vehicle crashes, which could then provide clues about how to avoid such accidents in the future. Rayner developed a driver recording system that could gather data from incident and driving recordings to provide insight into driver behavior and other factors influencing crashes.

In 1999, DriveCam received a grant from the Transportation Research Board (administered by the National Academies of Sciences, Engineering, and Medicine) to test the viability and utility of information captured by the DriveCam Video Event Data Recorder (VEDR). Also in 1999, Gary Rayner met Tom Lafleur at an engineering conference, and Lafleur became co-founder and the lead investor for an angel investment group that made the initial outside investment in DriveCam. Lafleur joined the company as chief technology officer and ultimately served as a member of its board of directors until the company's acquisition in 2016.

=== 2000–2016 ===
In 2005, DriveCam was included on Inc. magazine's list of the 500 fastest-growing, privately held companies in the U.S. and remained on this list for three consecutive years.

In 2007, DriveCam partnered with American Family Insurance to provide a video feedback program in which parents could review the driving actions of their teens. In 2010, the Teen Safe Driver Program was awarded the 2010 Teen Driving Safety Leadership Award by the National Safety Council. Scientists at the University of Iowa used the program to produce a 70% reduction in risky driving behavior. As of 2017, the company no longer offers the DriveCam for Families program.

In September 2008, Brandon Nixon became the company's CEO. Also in 2008, the company introduced RiskPredict, a pattern-recognition software system that could be used to help predict the riskiest drivers within a fleet. Through a process of scoring, prioritizing and tracking the results of individual driver behaviors, the model identifies those behaviors most likely to lead to a collision.

In 2010, DriveCam added new clients including Sysco, Masco and the Washington Metropolitan Transit Authority. The company also extended its contracts with AmeriGas and Waste Connections. Later in 2010, DriveCam was listed as No. 30 on The Wall Street Journal's list of top 50 venture-backed companies.

In April 2011, DriveCam was awarded a blanket purchase agreement by the General Services Administration for the purchase of in-vehicle video recorders and driver feedback systems. In December 2011, DriveCam announced its acquisition of Rair Technologies, LLC, a provider of compliance services for commercial trucking fleets. Upon completion of the acquisition, Rair maintained its headquarters in Brookfield, Wisconsin. Lytx, then DriveCam, Inc., filed a lawsuit against SmartDrive Systems citing patent infringement. The two companies resolved their patent disputes in 2012.

In February 2013, DriveCam added Greyhound Lines as a client, and on November 4, 2013, the company changed its corporate name from DriveCam Inc. to Lytx Inc.

In 2014, Lytx added Con-way Freight as a client. The same year, Sentry Insurance and ARI Insurance announced they would provide their insured commercial clients with subsidies to defray the cost of adopting the DriveCam event recorder. Also in 2014, the Virginia Tech Transportation Institute conducted a study of heavy truck and bus collisions. The study found that Lytx's video-based driver safety program had the potential to reduce fatalities, collisions and injuries.

In 2015, Lytx launched its ActiveVision service at the American Trucking Associations' annual Management Conference and Exhibition in Philadelphia. The service uses machine vision technology to identify patterns that may indicate distracted and drowsy driving, such as lane departures and following distances.

=== 2017–present ===
In 2017, the company launched Lytx Video Services, adding access to near livestream video and continuous recording of up to 100 hours. The company also added Walmart and U.S. Xpress as clients, along with UK-based tour coach company The Travellers Choice.

At the start of 2018, the company announced it had products in more than 3,000 commercial and government fleets with more than 850,000 drivers. In May 2018, Lytx appointed Steve Lifshatz as chief financial officer. Also in 2018, Nationwide partnered with the company to add the DriveCam safety program to Nationwide's long-haul trucking fleets. Frost & Sullivan reported Lytx's market share at more than 60% of the video telematics market. Later that year, Mack Trucks announced a pre-wire option for DriveCam and Video Services in all Granite Class 8 vehicles.

Also in 2019, Lytx joined the Qualcomm Smart Cities Accelerator Program. The program planned to use the dataset compiled from more than 100 billion miles of driving data and over 1 million drivers to help smart cities improve traffic and transit flows.

In December 2019, the company changed the name of its compliance offering from RAIR Compliance Services to Lytx Compliance Services. Lytx was also awarded Company of the Year for Video Safety Solutions by industry analyst firm Frost & Sullivan.

In February 2020, Lytx announced an expansion of its machine vision system and artificial intelligence technology. The new technology allows the Lytx DriveCam Event Recorder to record inside-facing movement triggers along with road-facing movements. The event recorder provides near real-time insight into potentially risky behaviors such as distracted driving, texting while driving, failure to stop at intersections, weaving between lanes, and following other vehicles at unsafe distances.

In March 2021, Fast Company named Lytx one of its top ten most innovative companies in data science, citing the company's updated platform, new AI and machine learning technologies, and 120 billion miles of driving data. The company's driving database continued to grow in subsequent years, reaching 261 billion miles as reported in its 2024 State of the Data report, and more than 341 billion miles as reported in its 2026 Road Safety Report. The company's 2025 Road Safety Report estimated that its fleet customers saved approximately US$1.8 billion in claims costs and US$521 million in vehicle maintenance costs in 2024.

In 2025, the trade publication Automotive Fleet reported that Lytx's global driving database comprised more than 300 billion miles of processed data from over 5.5 million drivers in more than 90 countries as of 2024.

Brandon Nixon, who had served as Lytx's chairman and chief executive officer for 17 years, retired from those roles in early 2025. The company briefly appointed Andy Eckert as interim chief executive before naming Chris Cabrera as chief executive officer in July 2025.

== Funding history ==
On February 18, 2016, GCTR, a Chicago-based private equity firm, announced it had agreed to purchase Lytx for $500 million in an all-cash transaction that closed in the first quarter of 2016. Prior investors in the company included Insight Venture Partners, Integral Capital Partners, JMI Equity, Menlo Ventures, Triangle Peak Partners, Welsh, Carson, Anderson & Stowe and Griffen LLC.

In April 2018, Clearlake Capital announced it had invested an undisclosed amount in Lytx. Other investors in 2018 included HarbourVest Partners, Public Sector Pension Investment Board and Guggenheim Investments. In January 2020, Lytx announced a majority investment from Permira. The investment put the value of Lytx at over $2.5 billion.

== Product ==
Lytx product offerings include a video platform powered by a two-lens dashcam, a driver safety program, a risk detection service, and a fleet tracking service.

== See also ==
- Vehicle tracking system
- Fuel management
- Video telematics
