= Video telematics =

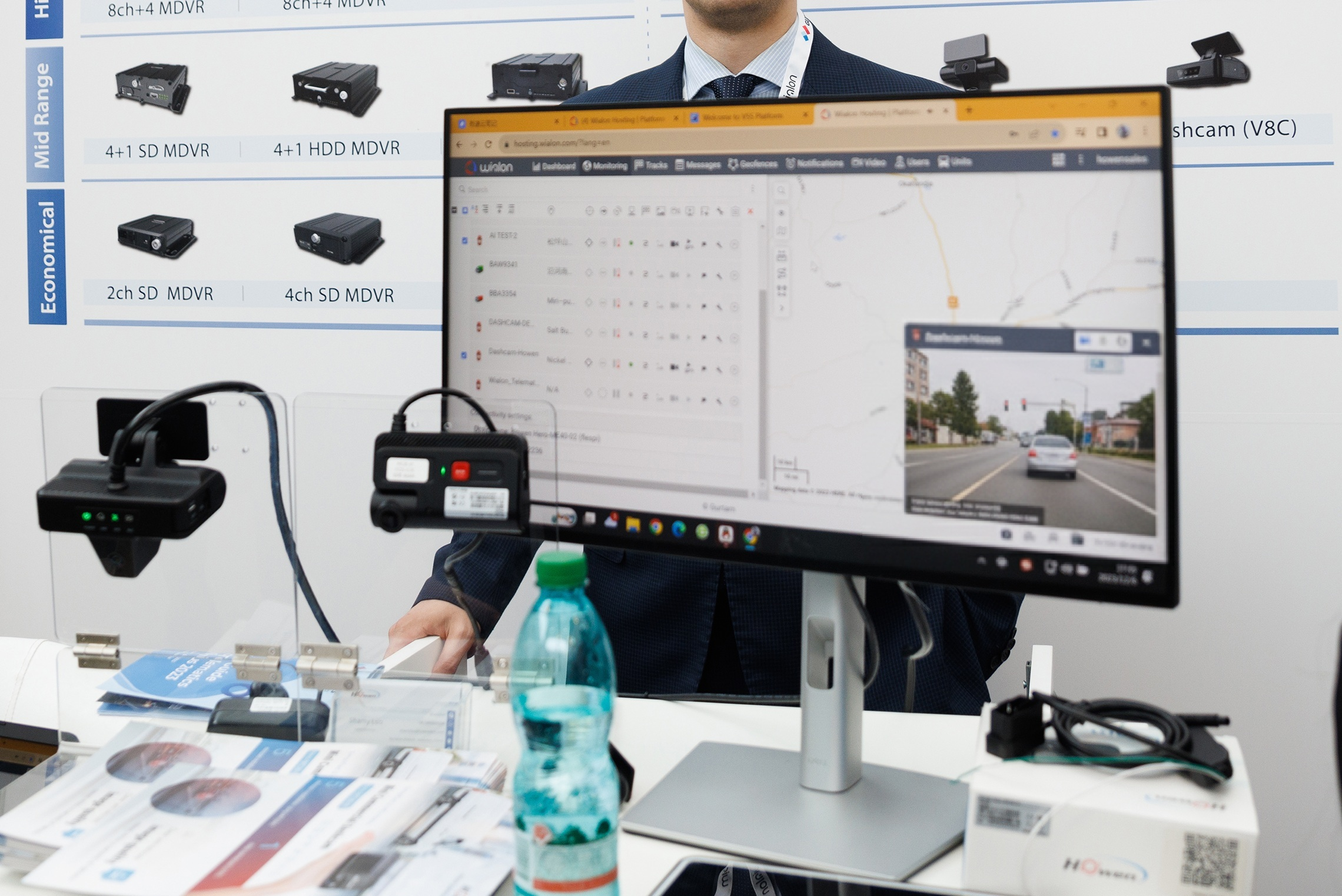
A software interface showing a vehicle's GPS location on a map integrated with a video feed and corresponding hardware

Video telematics is a technology that combines video footage with telematics data and sensor readings to provide information about vehicle operation. Alongside advanced driver assistance systems (ADAS) and machine vision, video telematics is used to identify unsafe driving behaviour, such as speeding, and to support improvements in driver safety.

As of 2023, North America was the largest market for video telematics systems, with almost 4.9 million units, compared with 1.4 million in Europe. Leading players of the video telematics market include Lytx, Streamax, Xirgo Technologies (formerly Sensata Insights / SmartWitness), Gurtam, Netradyne.

== See also ==
- Fleet management
- Intelligent transportation system
