= Grange Insurance =

American insurance company

Grange Mutual Company
- Type: Mutual
- Industry: Insurance
- Founded: 1935
- Headquarters: 671 S. High Street, Columbus, Ohio United States
- Key people: John Ammendola; President and CEO; Cheryl McRae Lebens; CFO
- Services: Property and Casualty Insurance
- Revenue: US$ 1.53 billion (2026)
- Total assets: US$ 3.32 billion (2026)
- Website: www.grangeinsurance.com

Grange Mutual Holding Company, commonly known as Grange Insurance, is an American insurance company based in Columbus, Ohio. Grange offers home, auto, and business insurance protection to policyholders through its network of more than 4,000 independent agents. The company, formed in 1935, now operates in 13 states. These states include Georgia, Illinois, Indiana, Iowa, Kentucky, Michigan, Minnesota, Ohio, Pennsylvania, South Carolina, Tennessee, Virginia, and Wisconsin.

== History ==
=== Pre-Grange ===
In February 1933, the Town and Village Insurance Company Services worked under an agreement with Grange Insurance Services, Inc. to write automobile insurance for members of the Ohio State Grange. Grange Insurance Services, Inc. served as a general agent in Ohio and conducted all sales efforts and promotions. Town and Village Insurance Services then wrote business under a special automobile policy provided by the New Century Casualty Company of Chicago, Illinois.

=== Early history ===
On March 25, 1935, Grange Mutual Casualty Company was formed as a non-profit corporation under the General Code of Ohio and as such, assumed the book of business from Town and Village Insurance Services. Its principal business was writing property and casualty insurance coverage for policyholders as a mutual insurance company.

Grange Mutual was originally an assessment company, and limited its sales to Ohio State Grange members. In 1942, a new hospitalization policy was introduced and offered to Grange members. In 1944, a general liability policy was added to the Grange line of products. Fire and extended coverages became available in 1955. By this time, Grange was a multiple line company. In 1958, Grange Mutual became independent of Ohio State Grange, and offered its products to the general public within the State of Ohio.

=== Expansion ===
In 2002, Grange Mutual Casualty Company partnered with Integrity Insurance, a small-sized company. Through this affiliation, Grange serves Wisconsin, Iowa, and Minnesota.

=== Restructure ===
On October 1, 2018, Grange Life Insurance Company was acquired by Kansas City Life Insurance Company. With the acquisition, Grange Insurance stopped offering life insurance policies.

In 2019, Grange Mutual Casualty Company converted its corporate structure to a Mutual Holding Company structure.

== Companies ==
Grange Mutual Holding Company has policyholders in 13 different states:

The Grange Mutual Holding Company includes a family of different companies:

- Grange Insurance Company
- Grange Property & Casualty Insurance Company
- Trustgard Insurance Company
- Grange Indemnity Insurance Company
- Grange Insurance Company of Michigan
- Integrity Insurance Company
- Integrity Select Insurance Company
- Integrity Property & Casualty Company

== See also ==
- List of United States insurance companies
- Mutual Insurance
