= Smartdrive =

Smartdrive may refer to:

- SmartDrive, a disk caching program that shipped with MS-DOS
- SmartDrive Systems, a vehicle telematics company in San Diego, CA
