= Carbon pricing on shipping =

Tax applied to marintime transport

Carbon pricing of shipping is a charges that applies to maritime transport ships for their greenhouse gas emissions. Maritime transport makes up 3% of total global greenhouse gas emissions. In order to reach the goals set out in the Paris Agreement, the European Union and the International Maritime Organization (IMO) have begun to implement or explore ways to reduce the carbon emissions produced by shipping.

== Overview ==
Carbon pricing has been proposed as a way to address a number of barriers to decarbonization in the shipping industry. Foremost among these is the difference in price between traditional fossil fuels, such as heavy fuel oil or marine diesel oil, and low-carbon marine propulsion. Putting a price on greenhouse gas emissions is intended to make fossil fuels more expensive, in turn increasing the competitiveness of alternative fuels (such as methanol) which have so far not been taken up on a large scale. Such measures are intended to also reduce rebound effects, whereby improvements in the energy efficiency of vessels result in greater use of shipping as a means of transport.

Some commentators have claimed that progress in this area has been limited by a mutual lack of motivation on the part of both ship owners and port operators to be the first to take action. In this scenario, potential fuel suppliers wait for shipowners to begin using low-carbon fuels before they invest in infrastructure to supply it, and shipowners wait for the infrastructure to be put in place before investing in ships that can use it. A carbon price is intended to overcome this dilemma.

== Carbon pricing ==
Carbon pricing follows the polluter pays principle, and is widely regarded as a cost-effective way to reduce emissions. In 2023, the European Union's Emissions Trading Scheme (EU ETS) was expanded to include the shipping sector. That same year, the International Maritime Organization, the UN agency responsible for regulating maritime transport, agreed on a strategy to bring emissions from shipping to net zero "by or around" 2050. Though the details of this are still under discussion as of late 2024, this strategy includes the implementation of a carbon price.

== Implementation ==
=== European Union ===
The EU ETS applies a carbon price to emissions by issuing a limited amount of 'allowances,' which can be traded. In order to make up for any emissions released, a company is required to surrender the equivalent amount of allowances. This, in theory, allows the EU to cap the total amount of emissions produced in the bloc. If one company or facility has more allowances than it needs, it can sell these to a company that requires more. This kind of system is known as 'cap and trade.' In 2023, it was decided that this system would apply to the shipping industry from the following year, charging for all the emissions generated by voyages between EU countries and half of emissions generated by voyages between EU countries and countries outside the EU. The inclusion of international shipping in the EU ETS will be gradual. Initially, the EU ETS will cover only 40% of the emissions, and it will be gradually expanded over time. As well as price, emissions from ships above 5000 tonnes calling at EU ports are also limited by regulation.

=== International ===
As of late 2024, discussions are underway at the International Maritime Organization regarding the details of an emission-reduction strategy that includes a carbon pricing system for international shipping. If implemented, this would be the first global carbon pricing system. An alternative method of carbon pricing to cap and trade would be a carbon tax.

The IMO GHG Strategy outlines a goal of reaching net zero emissions from shipping by or around 2050. The strategy also indicates that the decarbonization of the sector will be achieved via the implementation of a number of measures, one which is likely to be a GHG emission pricing mechanism. Discussions are underway as of late 2024 regarding the exact nature of that pricing mechanism. The IMO is composed of a number of stakeholders, including both member states and observer organizations, all of whom are able to put forward policy proposals to be voted on by the IMO Assembly, composed of member states. To date various proposals for a carbon pricing mechanism have been put forward, which vary in their level of stringency and flexibility.

Criticisms of these proposals at the IMO include the contention that applying such a carbon price will have a disproportionately negative effect on developing countries, for instance by reducing their export and import opportunities. China, Argentina, Brazil and South Africa are among the countries that have opposed such measures on these grounds. A review of empirical research indicates that the impact of such a carbon price on GDP may be limited. Others have argued that it is likely that other measures to decarbonize international shipping would also have a negative impact on trade. This impact may be higher than that of a GHG price, because carbon pricing tends to be a cost-effective measure, that is less expensive than other policy options. Additionally, the concurrent implementation of an IMO GHG pricing mechanism and the extension of the EU ETS to international shipping may create a situation where GHG emissions from shipping are priced twice.

== Revenue policies ==
Most of the revenue generated by the EU ETS system is given to member states. Initially, member states were only required to use half of this revenue on climate-related goals. As of 2023, the EU requires that member states use all of this revenue on climate-related projects. The remaining portion of the total money generated by the system is deployed into the two EU-level funds with remits related to climate change. The first of these, the Innovation Fund, finances industrial decarbonization. The second, the Social Climate Fund, provides member states with funding with the aim of ensuring that vulnerable groups are not negatively impacted by the green transition, for example by mitigating energy poverty.

Estimates indicate that an IMO GHG pricing mechanism may generate up to 40-60 billion US dollars every year up to 2050. As a result of this, there is considerable debate over how such money should be pooled, managed, and spent. Stakeholders disagree on the degree to which such money ought to be used 'in-sector,' (i.e. spent on further decarbonizing the shipping industry itself) or 'out-of-sector.' (used as general climate finance)

Several IMO members have highlighted that this revenue opens up opportunities for financing the energy transition in shipping itself, and also offers an opportunity to address concerns over climate justice. Other ways of taking climate justice into account, such as granting exemptions to ports in selected countries, have also been considered, but this opens up opportunities for price avoidance and risks unfairly disadvantaging some countries.

== See also ==
- Emissions trading – Market-based approach used to control pollution
- Marine fuel management – Strategy of fuel management
