= GuideOne Insurance =

American insurance company

- Type: Mutual company
- Industry: Insurance
- Founded: Des Moines, Iowa United States, (1947)
- Headquarters: West Des Moines, Iowa, United States
- Number of locations: 50 states
- Area served: United States
- Key people: Bernard Hengesbaugh (Chief Executive Officer)
- Products: church insurance, auto insurance, home insurance and casualty insurance
- Revenue: ▲$586.8 million USD (2014)
- Number of employees: 620 (2019)
- Website: www.guideone.com

GuideOne Insurance is an American niche-market insurance company based in West Des Moines, Iowa that specialises in insurance for churches, schools and students. It is one of the largest church insurers in the United States. The company is licensed in all 50 of the United States.

As of 2021, the company reached $1.06B in written premium.

== History ==
GuideOne Insurance appointed Adam Niebrugge to the position of senior vice president, chief actuary and risk officer, effective July 7, 2022. In this role, Niebrugge is responsible for leading GuideOne's actuarial team and overseeing the company's enterprise risk management strategies and its evaluation of financial risk exposures.

On July 5, 2022, AM Best, the largest credit rating agency specializing in the insurance industry, affirmed the Financial Strength Rating of A− (Excellent) and the Issuer Credit Rating of “a−” of the GuideOne Insurance Companies. The outlook of these ratings is stable.

Bernard (Bernie) Hengesbaugh was named president and chief executive officer of GuideOne Insurance Company on June 15, 2022. Hengesbaugh is an industry veteran having served in multiple leadership roles at CNA Insurance. He took over for Andy Noga, who served as interim CEO for the past several months and returned to his role as general counsel of the company.

On July 14, 2023, AM Best placed under review with negative implications the Financial Strength Rating of A− and the Long-Term Issuer Credit Ratings of “a−” of GuideOne Insurance Company and its wholly owned subsidiaries. These ratings have been placed under review with negative implications given AM Best's concerns with a significant decline in surplus and risk-adjusted capital ratios. GuideOne has taken initial steps to seek out capital solutions and the transaction would likely take the form of an affiliation or mutual holding company merger combined with reinsurance and/or other capital guarantees.

== Timeline ==
- 1946– William N. Plymat sent 10,000 letters to ministers and laymen asking their views on the idea of an insurance company that would insure only total abstainers from alcohol at lower rates than other carriers. The belief was that non-drinkers would be in fewer accidents than those that did drink. The company was established as America's first auto insurance company for nondrinkers.
- Dec. 26, 1946 – Preferred Risk Mutual Insurance Company (PRM) was organized in Des Moines, Iowa, with $30,000 capital contributed by Plymat, J.J. Mallon and Reverend Sam Morris. Morris, a popular radio host, was elected the first president of the company.
- April 1, 1947 – Preferred Risk Mutual Insurance Company was licensed to operate in Iowa.
- 1948 – A "merit reduction" plan was introduced, which was the first of its kind in the country. Policyholders received a 15 percent reduction in premium at their first annual renewal if they didn't file claims, with further reductions of 5 percent each year until a maximum of 40 percent was reached.
- Sept. 1, 1948 – Midwest Mutual Insurance (MM) was formed to offer motorcycle coverage.
- 1962 – The company introduced America's first multiple-peril package policy for churches.
- 1968 – A new home office building was planned at 1111 Ashworth Road in West Des Moines. The $2.5 million building received recognition from Administrative Management magazine as a finalist in the "Office of the Year" competition. The company is headquartered at this location today.
- 1972 – The no-fault automobile insurance, introduced by PRM in 1969 as "Auto-Matic Pay" generated legislation at the state and national levels. The Connecticut Legislature acted to make a similar plan mandatory throughout the state. Today, some form of this policy is available to car owners everywhere, and the concept is universally recognized as a staple coverage in insurance packages.
- 1980 – The Preferred Risk family provided seed money to help establish MADD, Mothers Against Drunk Driving, as a national organization.
- 1990 – PRM provided MADD with a $2 million donation, their single largest contribution to date.
- 1998 – Preferred Risk changed its name to Guidant Mutual Insurance Company.
- 1999 – Preferred Risk changed its name to GuideOne Insurance to help create a more recognizable product and brand name.
- 1999 – GuideOne received the Integrity Award from the Iowa Better Business Bureau.
- 2005 – GuideOne was selected as one of the "Principal 10 Best Companies for Employee Financial Security."
- 2011 – GuideOne was named to Ward's 50 Top Performing Insurance Companies.
- 2012 – GuideOne was named to Ward's 50 Top Performing Insurance Companies for the second year in a row.
- 2013 – GuideOne was named to Ward's 50 Top Performing Insurance Companies for the third year in a row.
- 2014 – GuideOne was named to Inc. 5000's list of the fastest growing private companies in the United States. The Inc. 5000 is ranked according to percentage revenue growth over a three-year period.
- 2016 - GuideOne becomes a commercial lines-only insurance company.
- 2017 - Jessica E. Snyder is named GuideOne's President & Chief Executive Officer.
- 2018 - GuideOne launches small business commercial insurance.
- 2019 - GuideOne National expands into new segment, Excess & Surplus (E&S) or Specialty Lines, focusing on three industry sectors: infrastructure, construction and energy.
- June 2020 - GuideOne Insurance (GuideOne) has chosen One Inc Digital Payments System to modernize the incoming and outbound payment functionality of the company.
- January 2022 - GuideOne Insurance (GuideOne) earned the Best in Class Employer designation from Gallagher's 2021 Benefits Strategy & Benchmarking Survey. Only four other Iowa award winners claimed the honor by scoring in the top quartile of the nearly 4,000 large and midsize employers that participated in the national survey.
- July 2023 - AM Best Places Credit Ratings of GuideOne Insurance Companies’ Members Under Review With Negative Implications

== Corporate sponsorships ==
GuideOne Foundation supports many charitable organizations, including Big Brothers Big Sisters of Central Iowa, Food Bank of Iowa, Habitat for Humanity, Junior Achievement and more.

== See also ==
- List of United States insurance companies
