= SmartDrive Systems =

Driver safety and transportation intelligence company

SmartDrive Systems, Inc.
- Type: Private
- Industry: Vehicle Telematics
- Founded: 2004; 22 years ago
- Founders: James Plante and Andrew Nickerson
- Headquarters: San Diego, California, United States
- Key people: Steve Mitgang (CEO)
- Number of employees: 725
- Website: smartdrive.net

SmartDrive Systems is an American driver safety and transportation intelligence company located in San Diego, California. The company uses video and driver data to monitor driver behavior in commercial vehicles including trucks, buses and trains.

== History ==
SmartDrive Systems was founded in 2005 in San Diego by James Plante, an automotive entrepreneur and Andrew Nickerson, a telematics executive. Plante served as the company's first CEO until April 2008, when Greg Drew took over as CEO.

In June 2012, the company announced media executive Steve Mitgang as their new CEO.

In May 2013, Ontario, California–based beverage company The Icee Company started using SmartDrive's programs for its 680 service and distribution vehicles. In October, SmartDrive announced it would begin capturing data from third party safety systems, including systems from Bendix, now part of Knorr-Bremse; Mobileye, now part of Intel; and Meritor WABCO, an alliance formed by automobile component manufacturer Meritor and commercial vehicle system manufacturer WABCO.

In March 2014, the company announced a partnership with Meritor WABCO to roll out a performance management system called Proview. In April 2014, the Utah Transit Authority announced they would be using SmartDrive's video systems for their buses and paratransit vehicles. Also in 2014, the company partnered with ProSight Specialty Insurance on a program called SecureFleet, where Prosight helped its customers pay for SmartDrive's data and video event recording system and driver coaching program.

By 2015, the company had grown to 450 employees worldwide, with 150 in the United States. In November 2015, the company announced several single and multi-camera safety systems.

In March 2016, the company announced its video-based driver performance management system was being integrated with WABCO's OnLane lane departure warning system. In June, the Los Angeles County Metropolitan Transportation Authority selected SmartDrive's systems for the city's bus and rail fleets. In August, truckload shipping carrier Knight-Swift announced they were installing SmartDrive's video safety systems in all of their trucks. In September, development partner Transdev North America announced they were deploying SmartDrive Rail on the Cincinnati Bell Connector streetcar fleet, which is managed by the Southwest Ohio Regional Transit Authority. In October, the company introduced SmartDrive SmartIQ, a data analysis tool that allows fleet operators to study safe driving behavior.

By March 2017, the company had grown to 594 people worldwide. In May, the company announced it was integrating its software with transportation management software from Birmingham, Alabama–based McLeod Software, to allow fleet customers of each company to share and manage driver records. Also in May, Cookeville, Tennessee transportation company Averitt Express announced it was using SmartDrive's road facing cameras in all its trucks. In September, trucking company Hub Group selected SmartDrive's video safety systems for its fleet of 2,600 trucks. In October, the company launched the SmartSense suite of sensors that use a combination of regular and infrared cameras to identify signs of distracted driving. Also in October, the company announced that meat processor Smithfield Foods had deployed SmartDrive's video safety technology across Smithfield's fleet of 600 refrigerated trucks, and that London-based sightseeing company Big Bus Tours was installing SmartDrive's Assurance program in each of its 68 buses.

In March 2018, SmartDrive announced that North American transportation company Daseke's subsidiary Schilli Corporation was going to use SmartDrive safety technology for its 300 vehicle fleet. Also in March, the company released its Transportation Intelligence Platform, which included the SR4 system hub for integrating sensor and camera hardware, along with event analysis software. In April, the company launched SmartDrive SmartIQ Driver Scorecard, software for companies to manage safety-driven driver incentive programs. Also in April, the company announced that the Penske Logistics subsidiary of Penske Truck Leasing was adding SmartDrive video technology to 2,800 of its trucks. In June, the company announced that specialty chemical company Clariant was adapting SmartDrive's video safety program for subsidiary Clariant Oil's 400 truck fleet. In September, RATP Group's RATP Dev USA subsidiary announced they would start installing SmartDrive's programs in its transportation systems in the United States. In October, the company partnered with Canadian telematics company Geotab to develop integrated systems using SmartDrive's sensors and Geotab's tracking application, to be accessed using third party devices such as phones and tablets.

In January 2019, private ambulance service Acadian Ambulance began deploying the SmartDrive program across its entire fleet. In March, braking control supplier WABCO Holdings combined its OnLaneALERT lane departure warning system with the SmartDrive SR4 video telematics platform.

In June 2020, SmartDrive announced American motor shipping carrier Swift Transportation, part of Knight-Swift Transportation, deployed the SmartDrive program across its fleet of roughly 19,300 tractors and 68,000 trailers. In July, SmartDrive released two new sensors - SmartDrive SmartSense for Speeding for Conditions, and SmartDrive SmartSense for Sitting Duck.

== Funding history ==
In November 2007, SmartDrive disclosed that it received US$46 million in venture funding, led by Oak Investment Partners and New Enterprises Associates.

In December 2009, the company announced a fifth round funding of $25 million.

In June 2012, the company announced $47 million in new venture funding led by existing investors Oak Investment Partners and New Enterprises Associates, as well as new investor Stanford University.

In March 2015, the company announced its largest funding round to date, a $50 million round led by earlier investors as well as product partner WABCO.

In October 2017, the company announced an additional funding round led by the North American arm of French tire manufacturer Michelin.

In September 2019, SmartDrive secured $90 million of new capital in an investment round led by global investment company Sixth Street Partners.

== See also ==
- Vehicle telematics
- Vehicle tracking system
- Fuel management system
- Information and communications technology
