= Citizens Property Insurance Corporation =

Insurance company in Florida, United States

- Formation: January 21, 1993; 33 years ago
- Merger of: Florida Residential Property and Casualty Joint Underwriting Association, Florida Windstorm Underwriting Association
- Type: Nonprofit corporation
- Tax ID no.: 59-3164851
- Purpose: Florida insurer of last resort
- Location: 2101 Maryland Circle, Tallahassee, Florida 32303
- Products: Personal and Commercial property insurance
- Key people: Barry Gilway, President/CEO & Executive Director
- Main organ: Board of Directors (9)
- Revenue: $1,897,811,815 (premiums) (2022)
- Disbursements: ($2,446,392,132) (operating loss)
- Expenses: $4,344,203,947 (claims) (2022)
- Endowment: $4,279,523,790 (reserve balance)
- Website: citizensfla.com

Citizens Property Insurance Corporation, commonly known as Citizens, is an American insurance company that provides property and casualty insurance to residents of Florida.

Citizens was created in 2002 from the merger of two other entities to provide both windstorm coverage and general property insurance for home-owners who could not obtain insurance elsewhere. It was established by the Florida Legislature in Chapter 627.351(6) Florida Statutes as a not-for-profit insurer of last resort and quickly became the largest insurer in the state.

The company is headquartered in Tallahassee, Florida.

== History ==
=== Founding ===
Hurricane Andrew in 1992 was the costliest storm the United States had experienced, with $26.5 billion in damage. It took a huge bite out of the reserves for claims held by 30 insurance companies doing business in Florida. Eleven insurance companies were bankrupted, while others stopped writing or renewing property insurance policies in the state. Those that remained raised premiums and deductibles across the board and limited the number of high-risk policies they wrote. Almost 1 million coastal homeowners were unable to find any company willing to insure their homes, so the Florida Legislature authorized the formation of the Florida Residential Property and Casualty Joint Underwriting Association (FRPCJUA) and the Florida Windstorm Underwriting Association (FWUA) as the insurers of last resort. The Florida Hurricane Catastrophe Fund was also created and managed by the state as a resource for Florida consumers and insurers. It is funded by assessments to every property insurance policy in the state.

=== Post Andrew ===
Hurricane damage between 1992 and 2003 was relatively manageable, with none or one major hurricane each year except 1998 (which had two). During that time, new insurance companies were started and existing carriers began writing policies again. By 1999, Florida Insurance Commissioner Bill Nelson stated that FRPCJUA and FWUA were close to shifting most of their 711,000 policies to private insurers. In 2002, the Florida Legislature passed legislation to merge the Florida Residential Property and Casualty Joint Underwriting Association (FRPCJUA) and the Florida Windstorm Underwriting Association (FWUA). This resulted in the creation of Citizens Property Insurance Corporation (Citizens), whose goal is to more efficiently and effectively provide insurance to, and serve the needs of, home-owners in high-risk areas and others who cannot find coverage in the open, private insurance market.

=== High activity ===
There were four major storms in 2004 that made landfall in Florida, with total damages exceeding $57 billion. The following year brought five major storms, including Katrina, the most expensive Atlantic hurricane of all time. Once again, several companies pulled out of the Florida market due to an extraordinary number of hurricane and new sinkhole related claims. Citizens became not just the insurer of last resort, but the insurer of only resort for many Floridians. As of 2005, Florida owed almost $5 billion, which would be recovered through insurance policy assessments. The cost of insurance and its availability became an important "hot button" issue in Florida, especially in the 2006 elections. Through 2006, Citizens Insurance charged its customers the highest rate approved by the Florida Office of Insurance Regulation to avoid competing with private carriers. Insurance agents were prohibited from writing policies through Citizens if there was a private (not surplus lines) carrier that would write the risk. If a qualified insurance company was willing to take a group of policies, Citizens Insurance would transfer them to that company and cancel coverage. Customers had no recourse.

=== Legislation ===
Florida Senate Bill 2498, known as the Glitch Bill, was signed into law by Governor Crist on June 11, 2007. This legislation permitted agents to write a Citizens policy for customers if the premium for a comparable policy offered by a private carrier was 15% (instead of 25%) more expensive. Customers were also allowed to stay with Citizens Insurance if they were notified that their policy was being assigned to a private carrier.

After 2010, eight global insurance carriers, including State Farm, entered or re-entered the Florida market. While the cost of reinsurance fell by 10% in 2010 and was expected to decrease more in 2011, the cost of insurance to consumers remained the same.

== Post-recession ==
In 2010, State Farm and Renaissance jointly formed DaVinci Reinsurance Ltd. in Bermuda, which covered more than 3.5 million Florida homes in 2010. That same year, Japan-based Tokio Millennium Re Ltd. became an approved Florida reinsurance vendor. As of 2011, Citizens had cash and investment totaling $11.3 billion and 1.3 million policyholders. The Florida Council of 100 published a position paper in 2010 entitled, "Into the Storm: Framing Florida's Looming Property Insurance Crisis". Chief among problems identified was that Citizens Insurance was undercapitalized and charges "rates that are not actuarially sound". The study also found that low-risk property owners were subsidizing high risk policies. They concluded that rates must be based on risk factors, including "geographical location, age of structure, and construction type". Florida House Bill 1495, passed in 2009, allows Citizens to raise rates gradually over five years to become actuarially sound. This was intended to shift the risk from taxpayers to the private sector.

In the spring of 2012, Florida Governor Rick Scott stated in a survey with the Florida Council of 100 that Citizens Insurance had $504.8 billion in risk and just $6.1 billion in cash reserves. PolitiFact Florida, a fact checker of the Tampa Bay Times and Miami Herald, researched Scott's claims. They concluded that while the company did have $500 billion in exposure, storms would have to damage or destroy every Citizens-insured home in all 67 Florida counties. A "century storm", with a 1% chance of occurring in any year, would generate no more than $21 billion in claims. Regarding the resources available to pay claims, the Citizen's own website states that their "Claims‐Paying Ability" is $19.5 billion. There is a $1.5 billion disparity, prompting the governor to order Citizens to reduce its risk. Barry Gilway was hired on June 18, 2012, as president and chief executive officer of Citizens Property Insurance Corporation, replacing Tom Grady. With 42 years of experience in the insurance industry, he has a reputation as a turnaround specialist. He was keenly aware that his first priority was to shrink the number of Citizens policies. Throughout 2012, Citizens asked 174,000 of its nearly 1.4 million policyholders to move their policies to five private insurers. Approximately 25,000 of that group chose to remain with Citizens, but Florida's consumer insurance advocate Robin Smith Westcott warned that, "For the consumer, there really isn't enough information." The state determined that those five private insurers were financially sound and able to absorb more customers, but issues such as higher premiums, customer responsiveness and number of consumer complaints must be determined by the policyholder. Florida law gives the consumer 30 days from notification to decline their policy transfer before it is assumed by a private firm.

On February 8, 2013, Senator Jeff Brandes filed Florida Senate Bill 724, a comprehensive bill to overhaul Florida property insurance law to avoid new "hurricane taxes" which would be necessary if another catastrophic hurricane ravaged the state. The proposal is unpopular among many Citizens customers because it would mandate more rate increases to what they consider to be already high premiums. A similar bill was defeated in 2012. However, businessman, and former US Representative Tom Feeney commented, "It is unfair to continue to require 77 percent of Florida homeowners to subsidize Citizens policies, in addition to 100 percent of businesses, charities, religious institutions, renters, automobile policyholders, local governments and school boards." The bill did not make it out of the Senate Banking and Insurance Committee before the legislature adjourned in May 2013.

=== Takeout policies ===
In an effort to encourage more private companies to acquire homeowners policies serviced by Citizens (known as takeout policies), the Florida Office of Insurance Regulation (FOIR) was authorized to provide monetary incentives based on the number of Citizens policies acquired. In May 2013, just three of the eight members of the Citizens Board of Governors approved a deal in which Heritage Property and Casualty Insurance, formed in 2012, was offered $52 million to take over 60,000 accounts ($867 per policy). Florida CFO Jeff Atwater admitted that Heritage did not have the financial strength to take over the policies without the incentive, but Citizen's President Barry Gilway insisted that Heritage was "one of the most well-capitalized" in Florida. In March 2013, while negotiations were in progress, Heritage made a $110,000 donation to the re-election campaign of Governor Scott. A spokesman for the governor stated that the Citizens deal was not influenced by the governor. State leaders criticized the deal as "corporate welfare for a politically connected startup". Former Chief Financial Officer of Florida Alex Sink criticized the transaction, noting that Florida law limited the incentive to $100 per policy. She was also concerned that Heritage's reinsurance may not contain full risk transfer.

New insurance companies in Florida must be approved by the Office of Insurance Regulation (OIR), which reviews the firm's business plan, projections and financial condition. The judgment of the OIR has been questioned because six of the 18 companies licensed to write "takeout" policies between 2007 and 2011 failed, even though Florida had no major hurricanes during that time frame. Florida taxpayers were forced to cover $400 million in losses.

Despite concerns about the OIR, "State regulators have approved six property insurers to remove up to 151,000 policies from state-run Citizens Property Insurance Corp. in February [2014]. [...] Florida's Office of Insurance Regulation last month approved First Community Insurance Co. to take out as many as 51,249 Citizens policies, while Safepoint Insurance Co. may remove up to 40,000 policies. Elements Property Insurance Co. and Heritage Property Casualty Insurance Co. each have been approved for up to 20,000 policies. Southern Fidelity Insurance Co. and Southern Fidelity Property & Casualty can remove 10,000 each. Private insurers have taken out more than 312,000 Citizens policies this year. [Citizens] President Barry Gilway has said the goal is to trim Citizens down to about 800,000 policies." As of April 2014, Citizen policies fell below one million, to 940,000. Cash reserves totaled $7.6 billion, a record.

=== Model change ===
Since the 2005 pull back by insurance giants Allstate, State Farm, etc., small, in-state companies have been taking a larger share of policies. These start-ups have not followed the traditional insurance model by accumulating cash reserves to cover expenses in high claim years. Instead, they pay as much as half of the policy premium for reinsurance to offshore companies to cover claims. In the seven years since the last major Florida hurricane, profits have risen, but many small companies shifted that money into affiliated businesses and ignored the need for a reserve. Insurance rates were based on the company making a reasonable profit after expenses, which included funding a reserve. The OIR suggests that insurance companies have reserves and reinsurance to cover a once in 100-year storm. Many firms in past years purchased less, and if claims exceeded reinsurance and reserves, they were taken over by the state, who paid off remaining claims. Those owners suffered no penalty for failing to act in an ethical manner.

As the 2013 season started, pressure on insurers to lower rates was high because reinsurance costs had fallen by 15% since 2012, which also had lower costs. Claim expenses were down thanks to seven years without a major hurricane, and rate hikes during those years increased revenue from premiums.

== Post-Michael situation ==
As of 2019, Citizen's policy count had dropped to 419,000 but rose again due to a number of issues. Some companies stopped writing policies in high-claim South Florida, refused to renew where roof age exceeded 10 years or the home was built prior to Hurricane Andrew, before Hurricane-proof building codes were adopted. Since April 2021, four insurers were closed as insolvent. One of those, Avatar Property & Casualty, had 37,000 former customers looking for an insurer. Unfortunately for 2,000 of them, they had pending claims against Avatar, and most companies have underwriting guidelines that prohibit writing a new policy for a property with an open claim. Lexington Insurance Company announced that they will discontinue home insurance, sending another 8,000 property owners to search for a new insurer. Lexington specialized in homes worth $1+ million and Citizens will only insure property values less than $700,000, so Citizens was not an option.

Citizen's Policies numbered 807,910 on March 25, 2022. When the regular Florida legislative session ended in March 2022, the Florida Senate had passed a bill to limit "free roof" claims and similar lawsuits, but the Florida House did not. Demotech is the company that issues financial stability ratings for 50 Florida-based insurers. On March 23, 2022, the top five executives from Demotech sent a letter to Florida's Governor plus the Senator and House leadership entreating them to pass reforms before the start of Atlantic hurricane season June 1. Failure to do so would cause Demotech to downgrade the financial stability ratings for "a number" of Florida insurers. Sen. Jeff Brandes and other authorities have warned that collapsing companies would cause massive growth of Citizens Property Insurance Corp, a huge bailout from the Florida Hurricane Catastrophe Fund and threaten the thriving real estate market. Following Hurricane Ian in October, Citizen's policy count exceeded 1.1 million and the company was projected to insure 15% of the market by end of 2022.

From early 2022 to the first quarter of 2023, seven Florida insurers had been declared insolvent including United Property & Casualty Insurance (UPC) with 135,000 policies. Their policies were concentrated in Southwest Florida and experienced 25,000 claims with losses of $864 million from Hurricane Ian. The Florida Insurance Guaranty Association board met on March 31 and filed for an emergency assessment of 1% on all Florida property insurance policies. That is in addition to a 0.7% for 2022, a 1.3% assessment from July 1, 2022, to June 30, 2023, and another 0.7% ending December 31, 2023. As of April 7, 2023 Citizen's policies numbered 1,248,000. Citizens Insurance Board of Governors submitted a 14.2% rate increase on March 31, 2023, effective in November. However, Florida statutes limit rate increases on homesteaded property to 12% per year.

In August 2023, the Florida Office of Insurance Regulation (FOIR) approved rate increases for commercial customers an average of 9.2% while rejecting the residential rate proposals that averaged 12% because they were based on "overall actuarial soundness, instead of individual actuarial soundness".

== Depopulation ==
Despite new state regulations that required homeowners with Citizen's Insurance to also purchase Federal Flood Insurance, June 2023 saw the number of Citizen's policies balloon past 1.3 million. Two private companies agreed to accept 26,000 Citizens policies in spring 2023. Citizens Insurance is expected to continue depopulating policies until they reach an acceptable number. Florida Governor Ron DeSantis admitted that Citizen's Insurance was not solvent: "If you did have a major, major hurricane hit with a lot of Citizens property holders it would not have enough to pay out." DeSantis also signed a new state law that allows the policies from private companies to cost 20% more than Citizen's rates.

Florida's insurance crisis was caused by widespread fraud and excessive litigation as well as more severe and frequent natural disasters. Florida House Bill 837, passed March 24, 2023, was intended to reduce the number and cost of insurance lawsuits in Florida. That issue was one of the reasons cited by insurance companies leaving Florida according to the Insurance Commissioner Michael Yaworsky.

In August 2023 FOIR announced that Mainsail Insurance Company from Texas was approved to operate in Florida. They also disclosed that 280,000 of Citizen's policies were approved for assumption by several insurers by October 2023. According to the Insurance Information Institute, "Legislative actions addressed the crisis, resulting in a 40 percent year-over-year decline in new property claim lawsuits in 2024."

== End of crisis ==
As of June 30, 2025 Citizens had less than 800,000 policies, a sustainable volume. The FOIR reported that average home premiums declined by 0.7 percent statewide in the fourth quarter of 2024, the first drop in nearly a decade, and home insurers collected more in premiums than they paid in claims despite hurricanes Debby, Helene, and Milton. That may be partly due to high claim closure volume without payments. Reasons for no payment include: the policy does not cover the damage claimed such as flood damage, duplicate claims, or the policyholder's decision to withdraw the claim. The data does not provide the reason.

== Problems remain ==
The average annual premium for $300,000 dwelling coverage is $5,728 in Florida. That is 2.4 times higher than the national average of $2,397. Many Florida homeowners see insurers' profits as an insult, considering the number of claims closed without payment.

2024 Hurricane Claim Payment statistics
Hurricane	Total Claims	No Payment	Percent
Debby	10,900	7,397	68%
Helene	67,266	37,951	56%
Milton	254,574	111,150	44%
Total	332,740	156,498	47%

== See also ==
- Citizens Insurance
