= American Strategic Insurance =

American company

- Company type: Private
- Industry: Homeowners Insurance
- Founded: 1997; 29 years ago
- Headquarters: St. Petersburg, Florida, U.S.
- Key people: John Auer, President, and CEO
- Number of employees: 500+ (2015)
- Website: www.AmericanStrategic.com

American Strategic Insurance (ASI) was formed in 1997 and led by CEO and President, John Auer. Its initial offering was Florida homeowners insurance. The company has experienced rapid growth and is now expected to offer coverage nationwide by 2017, establishing its place in the top 15 homeowners insurance providers in the United States. ASI is headquartered in St. Petersburg, Florida. These expansion goals are largely attributed to its acquisition by Progressive in April 2015. While this transaction allowed Progressive to have a controlling interest of 67%, Progressive has owned as much as 5% since 2012. The company paid $875 million for the acquisition. The strategic partnership between the two companies is meant to allow them to compete in the coveted insurance "bundling" market. Despite the acquisition, ASI still operates as an independent company, with CEO John Auer as its head.

== History ==
ASI's three company values (Attitude, Speed and Innovation) are displayed throughout the company's headquarters. ASI moved their headquarters in 2013 to a new campus built to withstand a Category 5 hurricane. The 13-acre campus holds two company buildings, and includes an employee gym and an R'Club child care facility. R'Club Child Care, Inc., a nonprofit child care provider in Pinellas County, Florida, opened its new location at ASI's campus in 2014, offering over 200 slots with priority given to ASI employees.

ASI has also been a Better Business Bureau Accredited Business since 2004, and currently holds a rating of A+.

ASI was one of several major homeowners insurance carriers tested by the Atlantic hurricane season of 2004, which included Hurricane Charley, Hurricane Frances, Hurricane Ivan and Hurricane Jeanne. The 2004 hurricane season was the company's first opportunity for a strong impression with policyholders.

ASI's current expansion goals are largely attributed to its acquisition by Progressive in April 2015. While this transaction allowed Progressive to have a controlling interest of 67%, Progressive has owned as much as 5% since 2012. Progressive paid $875 million for the acquisition. The strategic partnership between the two companies allows them to compete in the coveted insurance bundling market. Despite the acquisition, ASI still operates as an independent company, with CEO John Auer as its head.

== Segments ==
ASI currently sells homeowners, dwelling fire, renters, condo, commercial property, flood and umbrella coverage. Their policies are sold through over 7,000 appointed independent agencies. These agents are able to bundle ASI homeowners products with Progressive auto policies as long as the agents are appointed with both companies.

ASI began offering a private flood insurance product as an alternative to the NFIP in Florida. However, the company is currently taking what CEO John Auer calls "a cautious stance" with excess flood and private flood insurance policies, by only writing homes that are 2,500 feet away from water on the West coast of Florida and 1,000 feet away from the water on the East coast of the state.

== Subsidiary Companies ==
ASI functions as an insurance group with multiple insurance companies under the parent company ARX Holding Corp. These subsidiaries include:

- American Strategic Insurance Corp.
- ASI Lloyds
- ASI Assurance Corp.
- ASI Preferred Insurance Corp.
- ASI Select Insurance Corp.
- American Capital Assurance Corp.
- ASI Home Insurance Corporation
- ASI Underwriters
- ASI Underwriters of Texas, Inc.
- Safe Harbour Underwriters, LLC

== Notable personnel ==
John Auer, president and CEO at ASI, serves as a board member and chair-elect of the Florida Hurricane Catastrophe Fund Advisory. Previously, John was appointed to Florida's Property and Casualty Reform Committee's technical advisory council. He also served on boards of the Florida Windstorm Underwriting Association and the Insurance Institute for Property Loss Reduction (now the Institute for Business & Home Safety). Auer also attended the first Florida Flood Insurance Conference in 2015.

Angel Conlin, general counsel at ASI serves as the chair of the Florida Insurance Council Executive Committee and Board.

== Community Involvement ==
"The Battery Project" is an annual campaign that ASI has done from their inception. Each year, they mail 9-volt batteries to their policyholders to remind them of the importance of ensuring their smoke alarms are working and have adequate power. ASI CEO, John Auer, has been quoted as saying “ASI can repair your home, but we can't replace you or your loved ones.”

In 2015, ASI ran a fundraiser for Southeastern Guide Dogs (a nonprofit organization that trains guide dogs for the vision impaired and for veterans suffering from post-traumatic stress disorder) to assist in building a new 20,000-square-foot puppy academy building.

== Awards and Recognitions ==
In 2015, ASI was named on the Best Companies To Work For In Florida list by Florida Trend for the seventh year in a row, and one of the Top Workplaces in Tampa Bay by the Tampa Bay Times for the sixth year in a row.

In 2016, ASI CEO John Auer won the Engaged Philanthropist Award at the 11th Annual WEDU Be More Awards, which recognizes individuals who distinguish themselves in the nonprofit community by engaging entrepreneurial skills to build a successful nonprofit endeavor.

== Finances ==
ASI has a strong financial strength rating of A (Excellent) by AM Best Co. In a financial stability rating done on Florida specific homeowners insurance carriers, ASI was one of only two private corporations that the group recommended as stable. In 2012, three affiliates of ASI—ASI Assurance Corp., ASI Preferred Insurance Corp. and ASI Lloyds—also received an A (Excellent) rating by AM Best Co. Two other affiliates, American Capital Assurance Corp. and ACA Home Insurance Corp., were upgraded from a B++ rating to an A rating.

In 2015, Progressive acquired an additional 62 percent of ASI for $875Mil, bringing their total shares to 67 percent.

Currently, ASI has over $1 billion in written premium and $640 million in surplus.

== See also ==
List of United States Insurance Companies
