= SageSure =

American insurance company

- Industry: Insurance
- Founded: 2009
- Headquarters: Jersey City, New Jersey, United States
- Products: Property insurance

SageSure is an American managing general agent headquartered in Jersey City, New Jersey. The company specializes in catastrophe-exposed property insurance. Operating through a network of carrier partners, the company provides homeowners, dwelling fire, flood, and commercial coverage in coastal and wind-exposed regions across the United States.

== History ==
SageSure was founded in 2009 as a subsidiary of Insight Catastrophe Group, and began underwriting residential property insurance across coastal U.S. markets. During its expansion, the company established underwriting partnerships with various carriers.

In October 2020, SageSure introduced a Business Owners Policy program with SafePort Insurance Company. The expansion originated in South Carolina with future plans for Florida.

In May 2023, SageSure raised $250 million in a funding round led by Amwins and Flexpoint Ford. Ares Management and Citizens Financial Group were also identified as investors in the company.

In January 2025, SageSure acquired GeoVera Advantage Insurance Services, a residential earthquake insurance underwriting business.

On January 2, 2026, the company completed its acquisition of Gemini Financial Holdings Corporation and its Olympus subsidiaries. Following the acquisition, SageSure managed approximately 130,000 policies and an estimated $700 million in gross written premiums in Florida.

== Reinsurance and capital markets ==
SageSure sponsors the Gateway Re catastrophe bond series, which had exceeded $2.1 billion in cumulative issuance by July 2025. That same month, SageSure established Seawall Re Ltd., a Bermuda-based reinsurance sidecar that secured approximately $50 million in third-party capital for Anchor Re.

== See also ==
- List of United States insurance companies
- Property insurance
- Reinsurance
