= Merchants Insurance Group =

- Company type: Mutual Insurance Company
- Industry: Insurance
- Founded: 1918, Buffalo, NY
- Headquarters: 250 Main Street; Buffalo, NY 14202
- Number of locations: Over 1,000 agents 4 regional offices
- Area served: Primarily the North East and North Central U.S.
- Key people: Charles E. Makey, III, President & CEO
- Products: Personal and Commercial Insurance
- Number of employees: Over 300
- Website: merchantsgroup.com

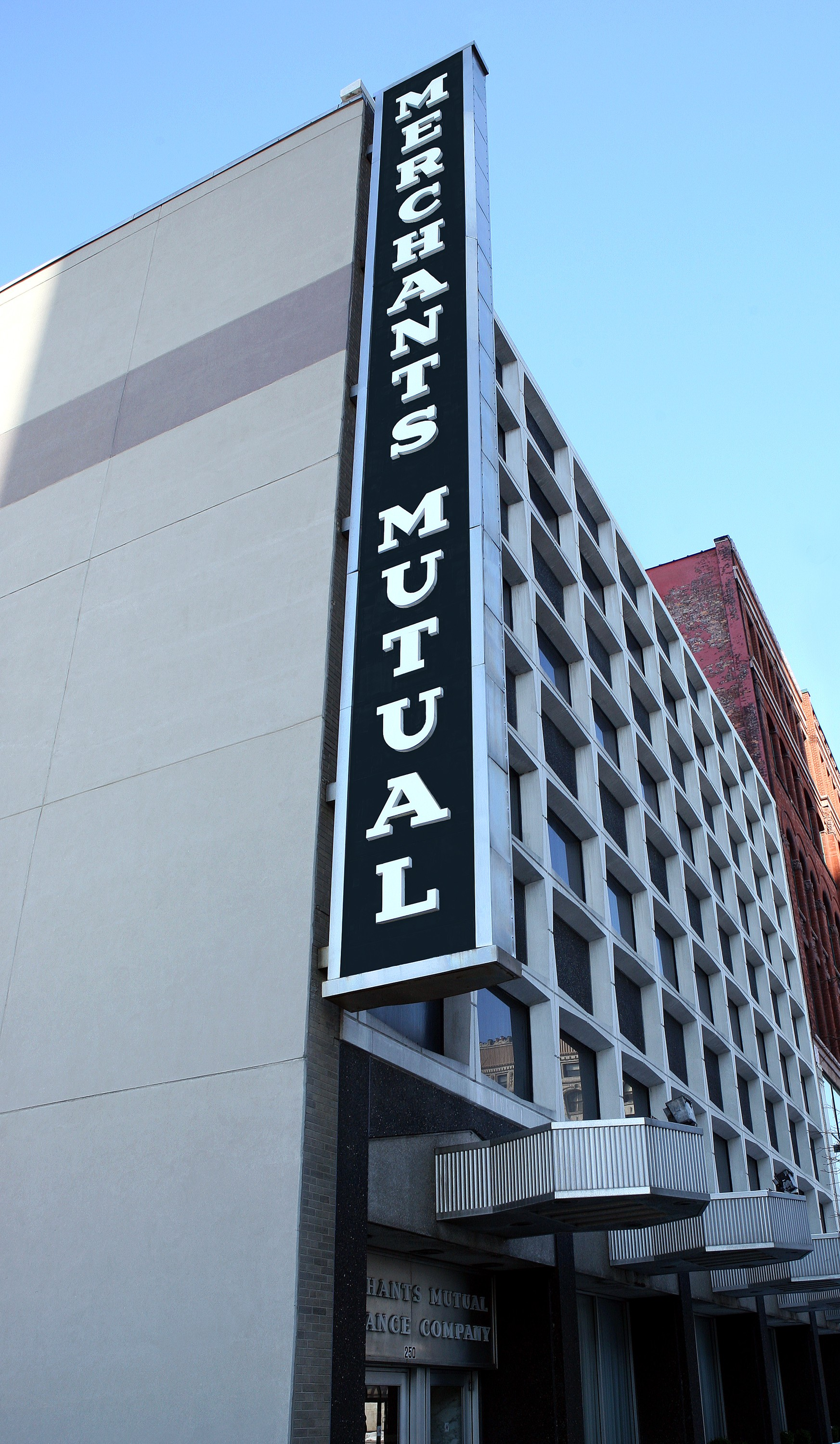
Merchants headquarters in Buffalo, New York

Merchants Insurance Group is a regional property and casualty insurance company headquartered in Buffalo, New York. The company provides commercial, personal property and casualty insurance throughout the Northeast and North Central United States. The company has regional offices in Melville, New York; Bedford, New Hampshire; Mount Laurel, New Jersey; and Buffalo, New York.

Merchants Insurance Group comprises three companies: Merchants Mutual Insurance Company, Merchants Preferred Insurance Company, and Merchants National Insurance Company. Merchants Preferred commenced business in 2007 to rebuild and expand its preferred-risk business after the sale of a like subsidiary, and Merchants National commenced business in 2009.

Merchants employs over 300 insurance professionals throughout its operating territories, and works with more than 1,000 independent insurance agents. The company offers insurance in Massachusetts, Michigan, New Hampshire, New Jersey, New York, Ohio, Pennsylvania, and Vermont.

== History ==
Merchants Insurance Group was founded on March 5, 1918, the day Merchants Mutual Liability Company opened for business with Urban F. Jehle as President. Mr. Jehle, owner and operator of a grocery store in Buffalo, returned from a grocers’ convention with the idea of bringing merchants together for the mutual protection of their delivery vehicles. J.R. Young, a local insurance man, Owen B. Augspurger, a Buffalo lawyer, and C.W. Brown, a civil engineer, joined with him.

In the late 1930s and early 1940s, the company name was Merchants Mutual Casualty Company. In February 1957, Merchants began to offer both casualty insurance and property insurance and changed its name to Merchants Mutual Insurance Company to reflect this development. In the 1960s the company moved into its current headquarters, a five-story office building located on Main Street in Buffalo.

== Philanthropy ==
Merchants Insurance Group supports a variety of charitable causes for organizations in the communities in which it does business, most notably the United Way and the American Cancer Society. In addition to Merchants' direct financial support to many charitable organizations, Merchants also sponsors an employee-based committee known as Colleagues in Action (CIA). Colleagues in Action allows Merchants employees to participate in a variety of activities, raffles, auctions, and casual days, the proceeds from which are donated to these groups. Combined, the company and employees contributed more than $512,000 from 1999 through 2018 to charities, with a total of $35,900 raised in 2018.
