= Connect (insurance company) =

American insurance company, subsidiary of American Family Insurance

CONNECT, powered by American Family Insurance
- Type: Private
- Industry: Insurance
- Predecessor: Ameriprise Auto & Home Insurance
- Founded: Green Bay, Wisconsin, United States (1986)
- Headquarters: Madison, Wisconsin
- Number of locations: Madison, Wisconsin; Phoenix, Arizona
- Products: Auto, Home and Condo, Renters, Umbrella and Specialty Insurance
- Number of employees: 1,000+ (2012)
- Parent: American Family Insurance
- Website: www.connectbyamfam.com

Connect (stylized CONNECT, powered by American Family Insurance) was an American insurance company and brand of American Family Insurance, formerly known as Ameriprise Auto & Home Insurance. It sold auto, home, condo, renters, umbrella and specialty insurance, mostly through strategic partnerships such as those with Costco and Ameriprise Financial. The brand was introduced in August 2020 after American Family acquired the business from Ameriprise in 2019 and its products were underwritten by American Family Connect Property and Casualty Insurance Company and American Family Connect Insurance Company. Both are subsidiaries of American Family Insurance Mutual Holding Company. In December 2025, Connect began operating under the American Family Insurance name.

At the time of the 2020 rebrand, American Family said that Connect produced about US$1.1 billion in annual direct premium written, a figure it gave as of 2019.

== History ==
In 1979, the Wisconsin Employers Group established the Wisconsin Employers Casualty Company as the successor to Wisconsin No-Fault Insurance, a Milwaukee-based insurer incorporated in 1972. American Express acquired Wisconsin Employers and placed it under its Fireman's Fund subsidiary. After Fireman's Fund sold off its health insurance operation in 1987 to the Lincoln National Company of Fort Wayne, Indiana, the casualty insurer became IDS Property Casualty Insurance Company, associated with Investors Diversified Services. It cut all ties with its existing independent agents and began selling policies direct to IDS clients. IDS Property Casualty rapidly grew, even as it remained a low-profile company in Green Bay. In 1986, it had 206 policies in force, $155,000 in premium revenue, and 22 employees; six years later, that had grown to 71,801 policies, $55 million in premium revenue, and 235 employees. American Express consolidated AmEx Assurance into IDS in 1995 as part of a move to begin business in all 50 states; that year, it was only operating in 25 states.

By 1998, AmEx Property Casualty had 150,000 policyholders in 37 states, though it was authorized to do business nationwide. The company built a new headquarters in the Ashwaubenon Business Centre in 2000.

=== Ameriprise era ===
The former American Express Financial Advisors became an independent, publicly owned company as Ameriprise Financial in August 2005 as part of a spinoff; American Express Property Casualty began doing business as Ameriprise Auto & Home Insurance. By that time, the company had 970 employees. That same year, the company also opened its second office in Phoenix, Arizona.

=== American Family ownership ===
On October 1, 2019, American Family Insurance closed on the $1.1 billion purchase of Ameriprise Auto & Home. By this time, it employed some 1,800 people and offered insurance in 43 states and the District of Columbia, with its primary business concentrated in the western U.S. and most of its premium generated from auto insurance. The transaction provided for a renaming of the business, which was announced as "Connect, Powered by American Family Insurance" in August 2020. As a result of increased remote work during and after the COVID-19 pandemic, Connect vacated the Ashwaubenon headquarters building and ended its lease on the site.

=== Retirement of the Connect name ===
In December 2025, Connect stopped using its separate brand and began operating under the American Family Insurance name. It said that the change would affect the brand name on policy documents. An automotive-insurance review site reported that the underwriting companies, pricing and coverage were unchanged. Costco members continued to receive discounted auto and home coverage through the partnership with American Family.

== Awards and certifications ==
- "A" (Excellent) Rating for Financial Strength, Stability and Soundness of Operating Performance - A.M. Best (the leading independent rater of insurers in the country)
- Consistently on the Ward Group's Ward's Top 50 list (top performing property and casualty companies)
