= Evergreen USA RRG =

Liability insurance company

Evergreen USA RRG, Inc
- Company type: Risk Retention Group
- Industry: Campground, RV Park and Resort Insurance
- Founded: 1989
- Headquarters: Burlington, Vermont, United States
- Products: Casualty Insurance
- Services: liability (business insurance); auto insurance; trailer spotting coverage; directors and officers liability insurance; garage liability
- Website: www.evergreenusarrg.com

Evergreen USA RRG, Inc. is a liability insurance company that offered liability insurance to privately owned campgrounds, RV parks, resorts, and paddlesport operations throughout the United States.

Privately owned campgrounds are often members of organizations such as ARVC (Association for RV Parks and Campgrounds), Kampgrounds of America, Yogi, and Coast to Coast.

Coverages included general liability (business insurance), auto insurance, trailer spotting coverage, directors and officers liability insurance and garage liability. Evergreen was formed under the Federal Liability Risk Retention Act of 1986 and is a risk retention group.

Currently Evergreen is in run-off and is no longer writing insurance policies and is only handling claims that have incurred on policies which it wrote.

Effective July 15, 2015 Evergreen USA Risk Retention Group Inc. (Evergreen USA) ceased writing new policies and ceased renewing existing policies, the company said in a written announcement. Evergreen will continue to honor all policies in effect until they expire.

== History ==
Richard "Dick" Hartford founded Evergreen USA because it was nearly impossible for campgrounds, RV parks and resorts to find insurance, in the aftermath of the insurance crisis of 1985. The unavailability of insurance coupled with the high cost of premiums charged by the companies caused serious financial problems for the camping industry.

In 1989 Evergreen was chartered in Arizona but in 1995 redomesticated to Vermont.

In 1989, with investments from 100 privately owned campgrounds and RV parks, Evergreen USA was formed to guarantee insurance would be available to campground and RV park owners regardless of market conditions. Licensed by the State of Vermont, Evergreen USA is able to provide insurance coverage to campgrounds and RV parks nationwide under the Federal Risk Retention Act.

“By showing the insurance world that campgrounds could be a good risk, (Evergreen USA) face(d) stiff competition from extremely large companies with the resources to beat (their) rates and provide incentives (they couldn't) always match,” said Lucas Hartford, Evergreen USA president. As a result, the Evergreen USA board of directors voted to strike a deal with Leavitt Recreation and Hospitality Insurance to provide renewal options to replace the Evergreen USA coverage when it expires, Evergreen said in its written announcement. Three account executives who previously worked at Evergreen USA have joined Leavitt Rec. Evergreen USA competed for years with Leavitt Rec."

Evergreen founder Dick Hartford died last year (2018).
