= Society Insurance =

- Industry: Business Insurance
- Founded: June 8, 1915; 111 years ago, Madison, Wisconsin (as Wisconsin Brotherhood of Thresherman Insurance Company, Limited Mutual)
- Headquarters: Fond du Lac, Wisconsin; United States
- Key people: Heather Boyer; President and CEO
- Number of employees: 300+
- Website: www.societyinsurance.com

Society Insurance is a business insurance carrier headquartered in Fond du Lac, Wisconsin.

Society has operated as a mutual company since 1915 and has experienced significant growth in the last several years. The company’s more than 300 employees and network of independent agencies currently serves customers in Colorado, Georgia, Illinois, Indiana, Iowa, Minnesota, Tennessee, Texas and Wisconsin.

== Summary ==
Society Insurance specializes in workers compensation, commercial property and casualty, and commercial auto insurance. While restaurants and bars are primary niches throughout their operating area, the company serves other small businesses in some of their markets.

Rating agency A.M. Best assigned Society Insurance an A− rating for 2023.

== History ==
In 1911, the Wisconsin legislature passed the state’s first workers compensation law. Like all other industries, farmers’ threshing crews were required to carry the coverage.

However, insurance carriers were not willing to provide the coverage at a reasonable rate. In response to that difficulty in purchasing workers compensation insurance for themselves, a collection of farm threshing crews formed what is now Society Insurance as Wisconsin Brotherhood of Threshermen Insurance Company, Limited Mutual, on June 8, 1915, in Madison, Wisconsin.

The company moved to Fond du Lac, Wisconsin, in 1918.

In 1930, the company purchased Threshermen’s National Insurance Company, a Madison-area competitor.

In the early 1980s, what was still Threshermen’s began offering property and casualty insurance to businesses.

The company changed its name from Threshermen’s to Society Insurance in 1995 and expanded into Illinois, Indiana and Iowa in 1996 and 1997.
