= Compass Rose Benefits Group =

US insurance provider

- Type: Non-Profit
- Industry: Health Insurance, Federal Employee Health Benefits (FEHB) Plan
- Founded: 1948; 78 years ago
- Headquarters: Reston, Virginia, United States of America
- Key people: Kevin Lanning, President/Chief Executive Officer; Joni Huber, Vice-President/Chief Operating Officer
- Services: Compass Rose Health Plan, Compass Rose Medicare Advantage Plan, Legal Protection, Identity Theft Protection
- Website: www.compassrosebenefits.com

Compass Rose Benefits Group is an American insurance provider that offers health insurance plans for civilian employees and retirees eligible for the Federal Employees Health Benefits (FEHB) Program.

== History ==
In 1948, an organization known as the Government Employees Health Association (GEHA) allowed a small section of Federal Government employees to obtain group health insurance plans. Since that time, a number of insurance plans have been added or changed.

In 1960, the newly established Federal Employees Health Benefits (FEHB) Act of 1959 provided all Federal employees, annuitants, and eligible family members with the opportunity to voluntarily enroll in a group health benefits program with the government sharing the cost of participation. GEHA qualified under this Act and quickly entered into the FEHB program. Due to name similarities with another insurance carrier, GEHA changed its health plan name to the Association Benefit Plan (ABP).

For over 55 years, the Association Benefit Plan was underwritten by Mutual of Omaha. In 2006, the company name was changed to Compass Rose Benefits Group (CRBG) and eligibility was extended to include all employees of the Intelligence Community (IC). In 2007, Coventry Health Care became the health plan underwriter. In 2008, CRBG extended eligibility to include civilian employees and retirees of the Department of Defense (DoD). In 2011, eligibility expanded to include employees of the Department of State and the U.S. Agency for International Development and the network provider changed to UnitedHealthcare (UHC), which is one of the largest network providers and facilities in the FEHB market. In 2021, eligibility expanded to include civilian employees and retirees of the Department of Homeland Security. In 2024, eligibility expanded once again to include all employees and retirees of the United States Department of Veterans Affairs. In 2025, the Compass Rose Health Plan opened to all federal employees and retirees eligible for the FEHB Program.

=== Evolution of company name ===
- 1948: Government Employees Health Association (GEHA)
- 2006: Compass Rose Benefits Group (CRBG)

=== Evolution of health plan name ===
- 1948: Government Employees Health Association (GEHA)
- 1960: Association Benefit Plan
- 2011: Compass Rose Health Plan

=== Evolution of underwriter ===
- 1948: Mutual of Omaha
- 2007: Coventry Health Care
- 2011: UnitedHealth

== Insurance ==
Compass Rose Benefits Group insurance includes:

- Compass Rose Health Plan, a FEHB Plan
- Compass Rose Medicare Advantage Plan, an enhanced level of benefits to the Compass Rose Health Plan
- Legal protection (liability insurance)
- Identity theft protection
