= Delta Dental =

American dental insurance network

Delta Dental Ins.
- Industry: Dental insurance
- Founded: 1966; 60 years ago
- Headquarters: Chicago, IL, United States
- Key people: James "Wells" Hutchison, CEO
- Products: Dental Insurance
- Parent: Delta Dental Plans Association
- Website: deltadental.com

The Delta Dental Plans Association, also known as Delta Dental, is an American network of dental insurance companies. It is composed of 39 independent Delta Dental members operating in all 50 states, the District of Columbia and Puerto Rico. These member companies provide coverage to 85 million people, enrolled in over 157,000 groups. While many of the Delta Dental member companies and Delta Dental Plans Association (DDPA) are non-profit organizations, a few of the member companies have for-profit segments.

== History ==
In 1954, several dental service corporations gathered in California, Oregon, and Washington to form Delta Dental. Delta Dental began working with Washington Dental Service to provide dental benefit programs for organized labor unions and later underprivileged residents through a partnership with the Washington State Department of Public Assistance.

Delta Dental Plans Association (DDPA) was created in 1966 to bring together these local state service organizations and coordinate dental benefit programs for customers with employees in multiple states. A year later, the first multi-state program was sold by WDS to the International Association of Machinists. WDS ceded the administration for enrollees in other states to other Delta Dental member companies and contracted with the Blue Cross and Blue Shield Association for administration in those states without a Delta Dental affiliate organization.

Coverage was provided this way until the late 1980s when Delta Dental of California won the bid for the Office of the Civilian Health and Medical Program of the Uniformed Services (OCHAMPUS) program. Delta Dental member companies agreed to share its provider data so the administration of this very large account could be centralized, with Delta Dental of California sharing the administrative income and risk. The OCHAMPUS program led to the creation of the National Provider File (NPF), which was made available for commercial accounts in 1990 via Delta USA – providing Delta Dental coverage to organizations with employees and subscribers located in multiple states.

In 2013, the Washington Dental Service was rebranded as Delta Dental of Washington. Delta Dental of Massachusetts and DentaQuest are subordinate companies of Dental Service of Massachusetts.

== Controversy ==
Some dental providers charge that vertical integration reduces insurance competition and dictates prices for clinical services.

=== Antitrust lawsuit ===
In 2019, the American Dental Association filed a class action lawsuit against Delta Dental, alleging that the company had violated federal antitrust law by setting reimbursement rates for dental services at artificially low levels. In February 2024, the plaintiffs in the case sought certification as a class consisting of some 240,000 dentists and dental practices, alleging that Delta Dental acted as a cartel and inflicted harms totaling $13 billion, including territorial restrictions, price fixing, and competition restrictions in violation of the Sherman Antitrust Act.

=== Compensation and non-profit status ===
Executive and board compensation at the CA based non-profit has been a cause for concern given that Delta Dental is a CA non-profit organized for the benefit of its rate payers. In 2019, board members received compensation up to $200,000/year.
