= Marine fuel management =

Strategy of fuel management

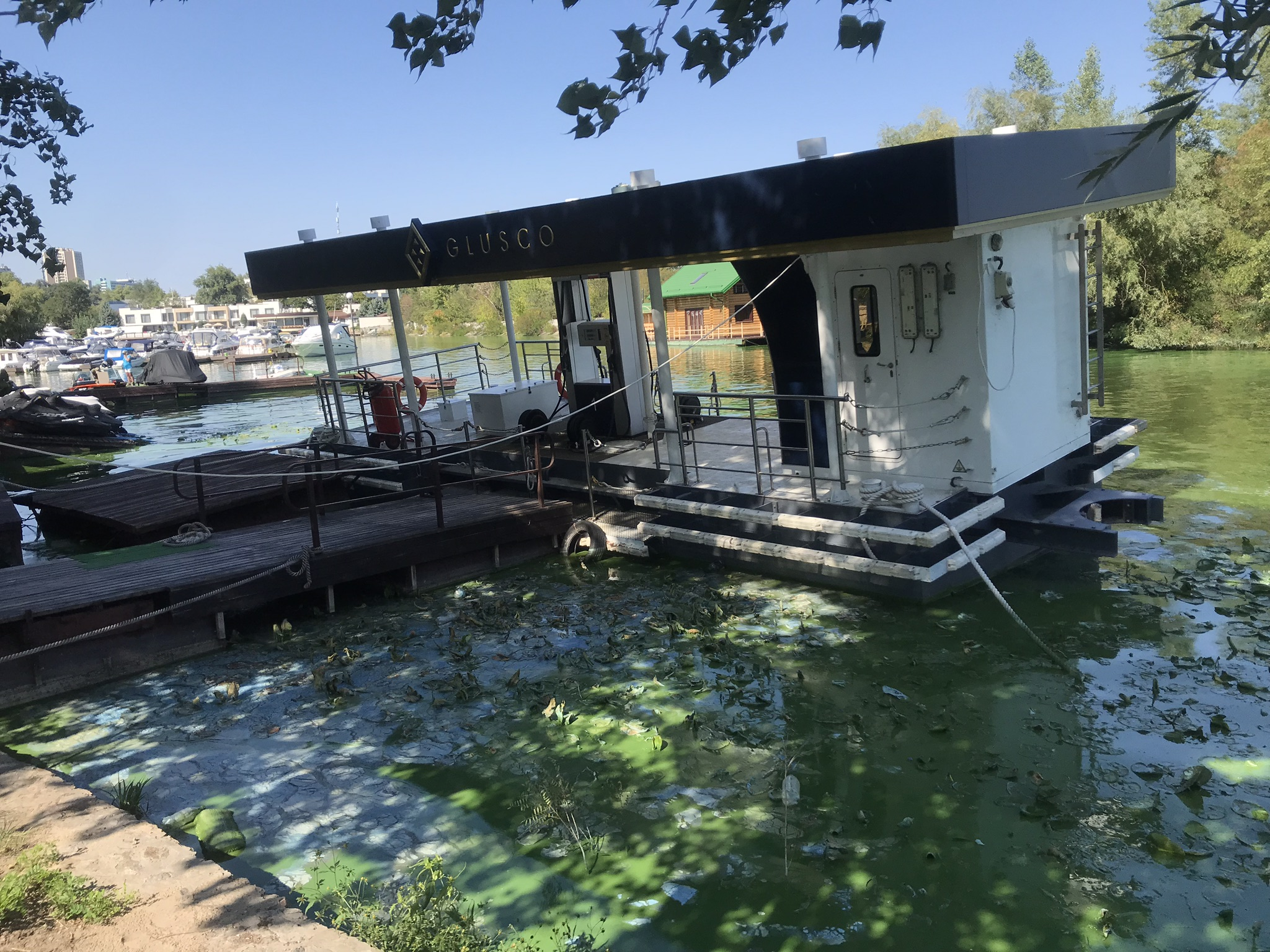
Marine station in Bartolomeo hotel, Dnipro.

Marine fuel management (MFM) is a multi-level approach to measuring, monitoring, and reporting fuel usage on a boat or ship, with the goals of reducing fuel usage, increasing operational efficiency, and improving fuel management. MFM has grown in importance due to the rising costs of marine fuel and increasing government oversight of the pollution generated by the world's shipping fleet.

Effective MFM relies on an understanding of several factors, including projections of fuel usage, records of actual consumption, how the fuel was used, and the variables that impact consumption.

Manual methods of measuring fuel usage, such as fuel tank dipping or sounding, often lack the detail to differentiate fuel consumption under various operating conditions, such as traveling versus idling in port, consumption by a specific engine (e.g., port versus starboard), use during different tasks, or variations between crews on similar voyages.

A clear understanding of how fuel is used establishes an operational baseline, which is necessary to measure the effectiveness of fuel conservation strategies.

MFM enables the tracking of actual fuel consumption and relates it to the work performed by the vessel. This supports the analysis of operating strategies and provides a clearer understanding of a vessel's fuel efficiency.

== MFM main functional areas ==
- Operational Performance
- Engineering and Maintenance Management
- Management Oversight

=== Operational performance ===
Operational performance includes those functional areas that impact the actual performance of a vessel or fleet. It includes fuel monitoring, inventory control, accounting, and engine throttle management.

==== Fuel monitoring ====
Many marine vessels do not provide a way for captain and crew to measure and monitor fuel usage while underway. This is often a key difference from land-based fleets where a telematic control unit is a standard part of a vehicle tracking system, providing data through telemetry. An optimum system onboard would include the ability to instantaneously monitor fuel burn rates from the wheelhouse. Individual engine and generator burn rates would be included, as well as fuel tank levels. This proactive monitoring would allow the crew to make decisions that positively impact fuel burn rates and efficiency.

==== Inventory control ====
Sensors are installed in fuel tanks to continuously monitor levels as fuel is taken onboard and burned by engines and generators. Periodically measuring tank levels using traditional manual methods is not accurate enough or timely, given the volumes of fuel that a marine engine can consume. Flow meters or gauges are installed on transfer lines where fuel is taken onboard or off-loaded to enable track and trace capabilities.

==== Accounting ====
In some parts of the world, fuel theft is an ongoing concern. Consequently, the accurate measurement of fuel taken on board coupled with the fuel actually consumed by engines and generators, is an important part of MFM. Flow meters are installed in all fuel transfer lines so accurate fueling data can be captured. This data can then be compared with burn rates to determine whether fuel is being transferred off the vessel secretively, which is a key function of asset tracking.

Beyond fuel theft, many governmental jurisdictions require that all fuel spill incidents be recorded and reported to the local authorities. For example, the Marine Department of the Government of Hong Kong has specific guidelines for responding to accidental marine fuel spills which reflect international requirements as promulgated by MARPOL, the International Convention for the Prevention of Pollution From Ships.

Additionally, accounting for fuel usage at various points along a voyage provides the ability to tie fuel burn and its associated costs to shipping or container rates. For example, understanding how a vessel burns fuel on certain parts of a voyage, allows the more accurate bidding of container rates so profit margins stay healthy. Consequently, varying shipping rates based on documented fuel usage rates can allow a shipper to bid more aggressively.

A modern marine fuel management system would help in monitoring fuel usage, fuel transfer bunkering events and could be configured to sound an audible alarm when refilling fuel tanks might lead to a spill.

==== Throttle management ====
Vessel operators have the most control over fuel usage by the way they use the engine(s) throttle. Wind, current, hull condition, load, and propulsion system health can all impact fuel burn both positively or negatively. Some operators choose to lower engine speed, and hence vessel speed, in an attempt to save fuel. However, engine RPM and vessel speed alone are not indicative of total fuel consumption, so arbitrarily lowering engine speed does not guarantee fuel savings. The process requires workflow calculations on how the propulsion system is operating under existing changing conditions and then tie that to fuel consumption. Simply lowering engine RPM does not guarantee an optimum vessel speed setting based on conditions. Some modern fuel management systems are designed to perform these calculations while underway and make recommendations to the vessel master, which can be used to implement a form of driver scoring based on fuel efficiency.

=== Engineering and maintenance management ===
As with any capital asset, manufacturers typically include the standard maintenance practices and procedures needed to keep the asset functioning properly and within design specifications. In many cases, scheduled maintenance routines are based on laboratory or design parameters and do not necessarily represent the optimum. MFM supports proper maintenance on marine engines and generators by using the actual fuel burned or hours operated as the basis for performing maintenance routines. This condition-based maintenance program more accurately reflects the operating environment of the engine, but more importantly, reduces or eliminates unnecessary maintenance work.

=== Management oversight ===
Management functions within MFM include:

- Vessel performance analysis and overall fleet performance
- Crew analysis with emphasis on applying lessons learned as best practice across the fleet
- Key Performance Indicator (KPI) gathering across the fleet to include fuel burned per mile or per ton; throttle settings at various points on a voyage; engine RPMs and exhaust gas analysis; and vessel performance against hull conditions.
- Fuel management from purchasing to transfers to usage
- Chartered vessel fuel performance and adherence to contractual obligations

Achieving this level of oversight often involves the use of a tracking system. Data from an onboard GPS tracking unit provides vehicle location data, enabling automatic vehicle location (AVL). This integration of data is a hallmark of fleet digitalization.

== See also ==
- Energy conservation
- Fuel
  - Fuel oil
- Fuel price risk management
- Fuel management systems
- Marine propulsion
- MARPOL
- Ship pollution
- Environmental impact of shipping
