= Assurity Life Insurance Company =

Life insurance company

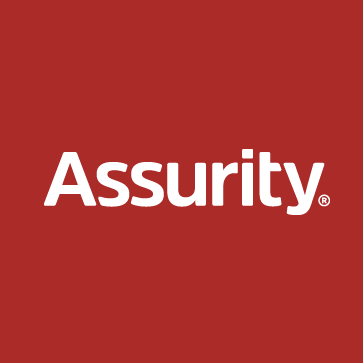

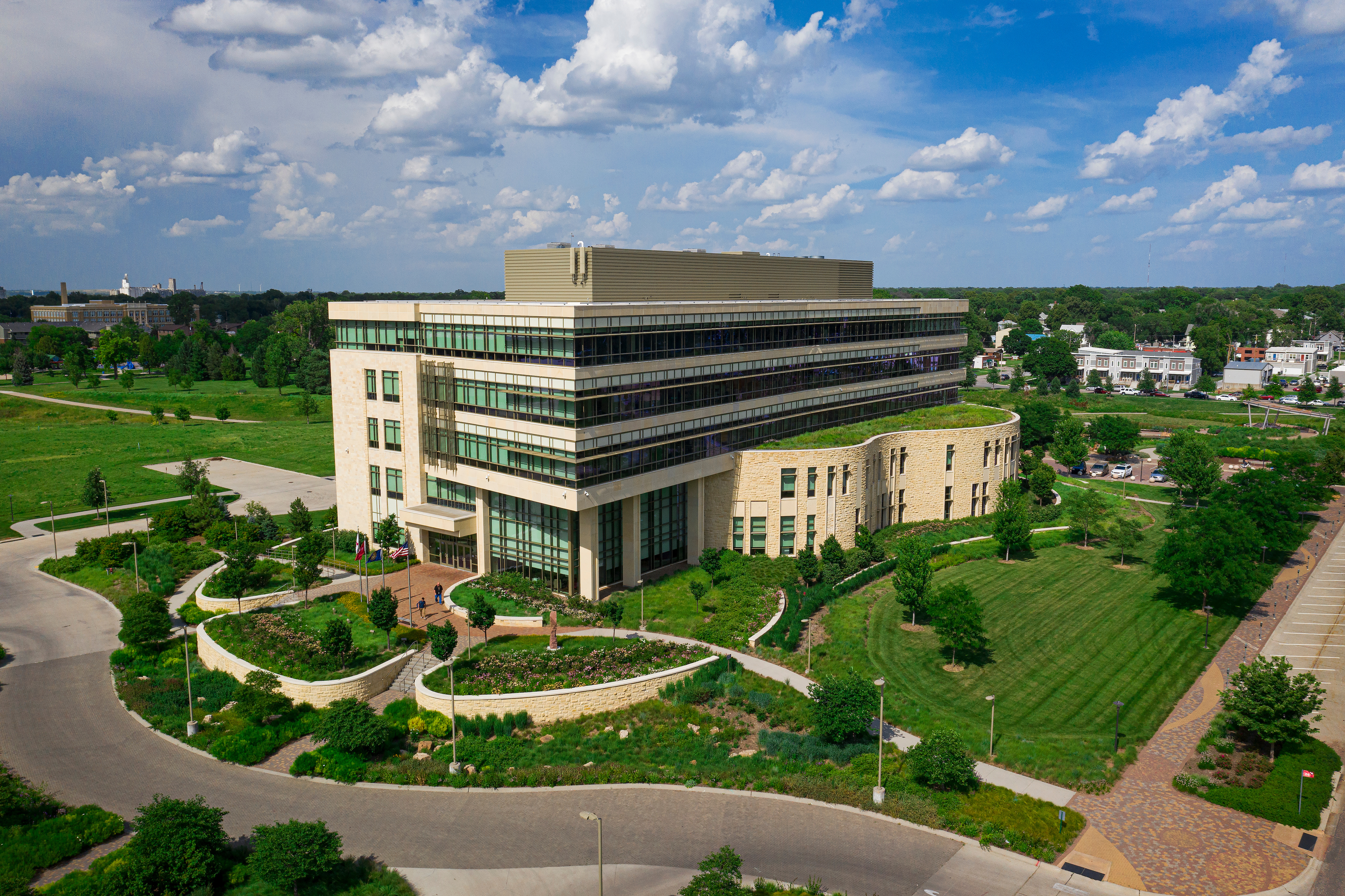
- Headquarter building in 2019, known as the Aussurity Center
- Type: Mutual organization
- Industry: Insurance & Finance
- Predecessor: Woodmen Accident and Life, Security Financial Life, and Lincoln Direct Life
- Founded: 2007; 19 years ago
- Headquarters: Lincoln, Nebraska, United States
- Products: Insurance
- Rating: A− (2021 by AM Best)
- Website: www.assurity.com

Assurity Life Insurance Company (Assurity) is an American mutual insurance organization based in Lincoln, Nebraska. Assurity employs approximately 400 associates and is licensed to conduct business in all U.S. states and the District of Columbia, except New York. The Assurity Life Insurance Company of New York conducts business within the state of New York.

In December 2015, Assurity became a certified B corporation, the largest insurance company at the time to earn that designation.

== History ==
Assurity was created as the result of a merger of three Lincoln, Nebraska insurance companies: Woodmen Accident and Life, Security Financial Life, and Lincoln Direct Life. The merger of the companies concluded in 2007.

Woodmen Accident and Life began in 1890 using the name Modern Woodmen Accident Association. Security Financial Life began in 1895 using the name Security Mutual Life. Lincoln Direct Life began in 1896 using the name The Royal Highlanders.

By 2022, Assurity was hosting three podcasts. Tips from the Insurance Pros and Focus on Voluntary Benefits center on the individual and worksite sales markets, respectively. Guests have included representatives from Whole Foods Market, Cornell University and the Arbor Day Foundation.

== Rating and finances ==
A.M. Best Company rated Assurity Life Insurance Company as A− (excellent) and the company received an A+ rating from the Better Business Bureau. As of 2021, Assurity had more than $2.66 billion in assets under management.

== Head office building ==
Opened in 2011, Assurity Center was the first large office building in Lincoln to receive LEED Gold Certification.
