= Physicians Mutual =

Mutual insurance company

- Type: Private
- Industry: Insurance
- Founded: 1902; 124 years ago
- Founder: Edwin E. Elliott
- Headquarters: Omaha, Nebraska, U.S.
- Website: physiciansmutual.com

Physicians Mutual is an American mutual insurance company headquartered in Omaha, Nebraska, United States. It consists of Physicians Mutual Insurance Company and Physicians Life Insurance Company.

The company offers a variety of insurance products, Medicare, Medigap, Medicare Supplement, Dental InsuranceTerm Life Insurance, Whole Life Insurance, and cancer and funeral pre-planning services. In 2022, it began to offer Pet Insurance.

The company holds over US$4 billion in assets and employs over 1000 people, and has Rob Reed as its president and chief executive officer.

== History ==
- 1902 - Founded as Physicians Mutual Insurance Company by Edwin E. Elliott, Physicians Mutual began by selling health insurance to medical professionals.
- 1962 - Policies were offered to the general public.
- 1970 - The company expanded into life insurance when it founded Physicians Life Insurance Company.
- 2012 - To better address the increasing demands of funeral home owners and the families they represent, the company joined the funeral pre-planning business.
- 2019 - Physicians Mutual Insurance Company introduced a new marketing advertisement featuring comedic actor John Michael Higgins.
