= CareSource =

Health Insurance Provider

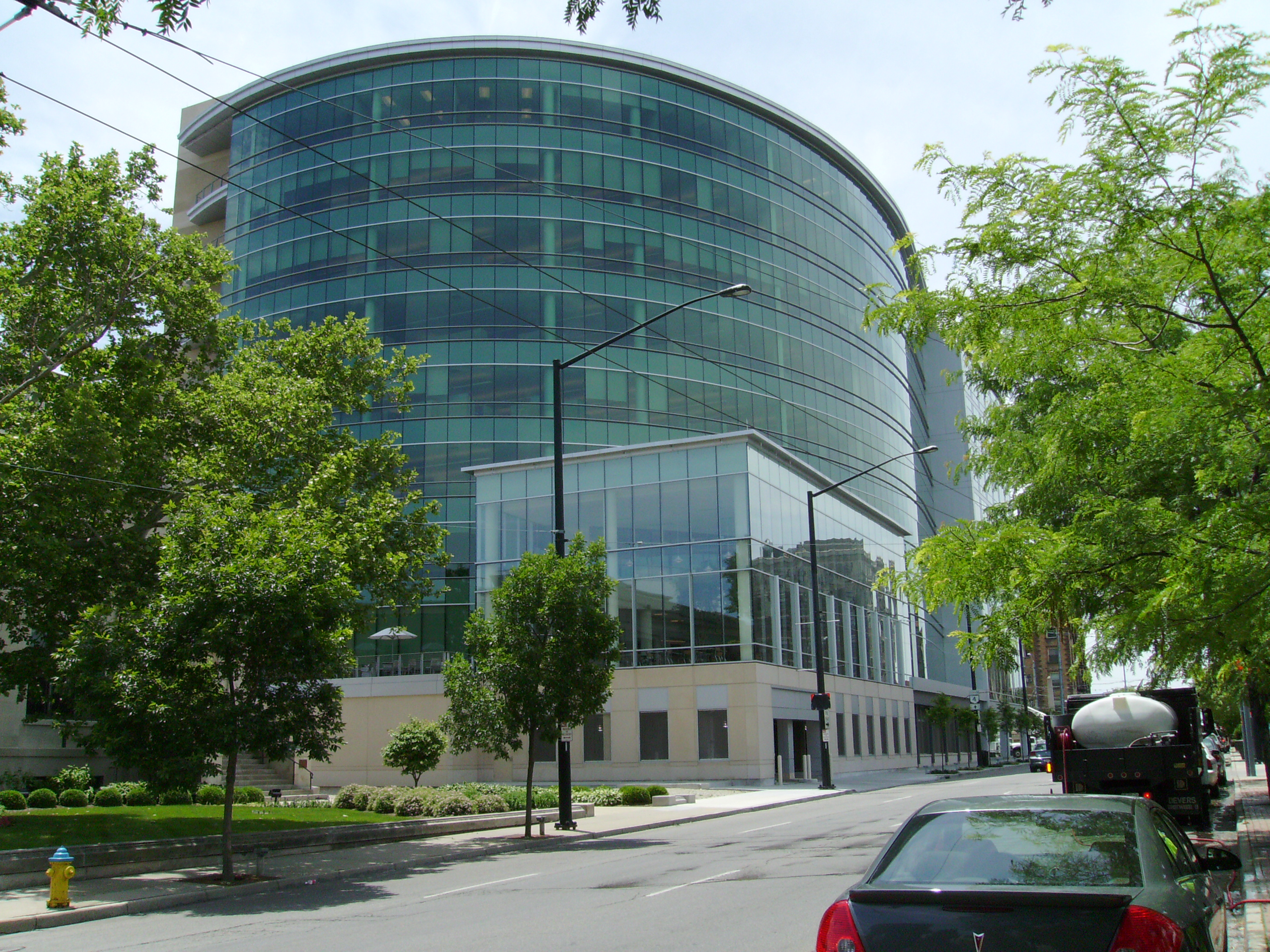
- CareSource Corporate Headquarters in Dayton, Ohio
- Formerly: Dayton Area Health Plan
- Type: Non-Profit
- Industry: health care
- Founded: 1989
- Founder: Pamela Morris
- Headquarters: Dayton, Ohio, United States
- Area served: Ohio, Kentucky, Indiana, West Virginia, Georgia, North Carolina
- Key people: Erhardt Preitauer, President and CEO
- Products: Medicaid Managed Care plans, Health Insurance Marketplace plans, MyCare Ohio plan, Medicare Advantage plans
- Revenue: $8.8 Billion USD (2017)
- Total assets: 76,488,161 United States dollar (2011)
- Members: 2 million
- Number of employees: 4,500
- Website: www.caresource.com

CareSource is a nonprofit that began as a managed health care plan serving Medicaid members in Ohio. Today, it provides public health care programs including Medicaid, Medicare, and Marketplace. The company is headquartered in Dayton, Ohio. It is the largest Medicaid plan in Ohio and is second largest in the United States.

== History ==
CareSource was founded as the Dayton Area Health Plan in 1985 by several community leaders including Rush Jordan and Thomas Beckett who were two of the three hospital CEOs who filed its Articles of Incorporation. James Hurak was appointed as the first leader of DAHP and it was housed in the offices of the Dayton Area Hospital Association. Mr Hurak was succeeded by Pamela Morris who has been primarily responsible for the success of the organization.

Under Morris, the company dealt with several regulatory hurdles from 1987 to 1989, in connection with the Ohio Department of Insurance. The DAHP had to raise funds, secure an HMO license and obtain a federal waiver allowing the company to operate solely as a mandatory enrollment plan. The DAHP would become the first mandatory Medicaid managed care program in 1989 In 1993 the federal waiver would expire and in order to allow the organization to continue, Congressional action would be required. U.S. Congressman Dave Hobson intervened on its behalf to gain an exception for the DAHP.

In 1996, the DAHP expanded into the Columbus market with their Medicaid plan by buying the plan United Healthcare was administering. With this expansion, the Dayton Area Health Plan became the largest Medicaid HMO in Ohio. The plan in Columbus kept its previous name, MedPlan. In 1997, the plan acquired Butler Health Plan and gained 6,000 more members in Butler County. During this time, all plans operated by the Dayton Area Health plan kept their regional names.

In the year 2000, DAHP consolidated all its health plans under one name – CareSource. In this year, the company had about 70,000 members. By 2003 that number exceeded 320,000.

In 2006, desiring to support surrounding non-profits, CareSource established the CareSource Foundation. The Foundation collaborates with non-profits who share in the mission of serving the underserved. It has awarded a total of 693 grants to non-profit organizations so far. In this same year when the economy was down in Dayton, Ohio and major employers like National Cash Register, General Motors, and Delphi closed or left town. In 2007 employment in the area remained weak, but CareSource saw business growth and became the only Medicaid Managed Care provider to offer services in all 88 counties in Ohio. That year CareSource broke ground on its new corporate headquarters in Downtown Dayton, showing the company's commitment to the city it was founded in. The project was the largest urban building development in Ohio at the time. Construction was completed in 2009 on the $55 million corporate headquarters at the corner of Main Street and Monument Avenue in downtown Dayton. The 300,000-square-foot, 9-story building is downtown's first new office tower since before 2000.

By 2010, the company was the third largest Medicaid HMO in the country, with $2.5 billion in revenue and 800,000 members across Ohio and Michigan. In 2010, CareSource announced expansion of its provider network in Southeastern Ohio through a partnership with Quality Care Partners (QCP), a physician-hospital organization (PHO).

In 2012, the company announced a partnership with Humana. This partnership worked to serve dual-eligible populations, or individuals who qualify for both Medicare and Medicaid in Ohio. In October 2012, the company expanded into Kentucky Medicaid with Humana, where the plan was known as Humana - CareSource.

CareSource was the third largest company in the Dayton Area in 2013, behind AK Steel and Speedway, ranked by total revenue. From 2011 to 2012, the company's revenue grew 21.43 percent to $3.4 billion. CareSource's percent growth was more than double the average revenue growth of the other 99 largest Dayton companies in that time frame. After the passing of the Affordable Care Act, CareSource created a product which allowed the company to enter the commercial insurance market.

In 2014, MyCare Ohio was launched to integrate Medicare and Medicaid benefits. CareSource used this opportunity to create a plan which assimilates both Medicaid and Medicare into one CareSource health plan. The company would also exceed 2,000 employees and occupy the offices in three buildings in downtown Dayton by the end of the year. The company also announced plans to expand into the health insurance marketplaces of Kentucky and Indiana. The constant growth that CareSource experienced with healthcare reform and Medicaid expansion made it the third largest company in the Dayton area again in 2014.

In late 2014 and early 2015 a new division of CareSource was launched to address the other unmet needs of the company's Ohio Medicaid population. The division, CareSource Life Services, began working with members in the Dayton-area. Through a partnership with Fuyao Glass America, the company was able to set up interviews for 40 members for full-time employment with the manufacturing company. Karin VanZant, the cofounder and executive director of Think Tank, was hired to oversee the program. Under VanZant's leadership, the program grew to address other aspects that contribute to a person's health including their housing and economic stability. This new approach informed the way CareSource began to see its members.

In April 2018, Pamela Morris retired as president and CEO. In May 2018, CareSource named Erhardt Preitauer as CEO. Preitauer was the former CEO of Horizon NJ Health.

In 2020 CareSource became the largest locally owned company by revenue in the Dayton-area after Marathon Petroleum Corp. announced its agreement to sell Speedway to the corporate owner of international convenience store chain 7-Eleven. In 2020, the company had $11.8 billion in revenue and 4,500 employees. According to an economic impact study performed by the Center for Economic Development at Cleveland State University's Maxine Goodman Levin College of Urban Affairs, CareSource fuels 8,400 Ohio jobs and $1 Billion of impact for Ohio.

The CareSource Foundation celebrated its 15th anniversary in 2021. CareSource Foundation has given more than $21 million in grants to 875 different organizations throughout Ohio. Beyond the Foundation, CareSource invested in affordable housing initiatives as part of its efforts in Social Determinants of Health and in 2020 it announced a commitment of $50 million to housing across the U.S.

In January 2025, CareSource acquired Common Ground Healthcare Cooperative (CGHC); CGHC arose out of an Affordable Care Act law which funded new health insurance cooperatives.

== Recognition ==
In 2004, the organization was ranked the sixth-largest Medicaid managed care plan in the United States by Interstudy.

In 2013, a report from Ohio Hospital Association states that CareSource is the No. 2 health insurer in the state by premium revenue.

CareSource celebrated 25 years as one of the nation's largest Managed Medicaid Plans and the largest in Ohio in 2014. The company then served more than 1 million consumers in Ohio and Kentucky.

In 2019 and 2020, CareSource earned a high quality rating in the Ohio Department of Medicaid (ODM) Managed Care Plans Report Card.

== Service area ==
Headquartered in Dayton, Ohio, CareSource has a workforce of 4,000 employees and covers nearly 2 million members. There are satellite offices in the Ohio cities of Cleveland and Columbus, as well as Atlanta, Indianapolis, and Louisville, Kentucky.

The company serves consumers in Georgia, Indiana, Kentucky, Ohio, and West Virginia.

In 2016, CareSource began serving members in West Virginia through its health exchange product and was awarded the contract to serve Medicaid populations in Indiana and Georgia. CareSource announced in October 2016 that the company would build a new 6-story office building in downtown Dayton. The new building would provide space for 800 employees and create a campus-like environment in the urban core. The new office, named the Pamela Morris Center to honor the legacy of its founder, will be located at First and Jefferson streets and be the first new high-rise in downtown Dayton since the company's headquarters opened in 2008.

CEO Erhardt Preitauer was recognized by Glassdoor in its 2019 Employees' Choice Awards as one of the top 20 CEOs. In 2020 Preitauer appeared on the cover of CEO Today magazine's Healthcare Awards edition.
