= Netradyne =

American artificial intelligence company

- NetraDyne Driver•i fleet safety camera system
- Type: Private
- Industry: Technology, SaaS, Fleet management, Artificial intelligence
- Founded: 2015
- Founders: Avneesh Agrawal; David Julian
- Headquarters: San Diego, California, United States
- Area served: Worldwide
- Key people: Avneesh Agrawal (CEO)
- Products: Driver•i platform
- Number of employees: 1000 (2025)
- Website: www.netradyne.com

Netradyne is an American technology company that develops artificial intelligence-powered video telematics and fleet safety systems. Founded in 2015, it is headquartered in San Diego, California, with a major engineering and research center in Bengaluru, India.

In January 2025, it became India's first Unicorn (valuation exceeding $1 billion) after getting the Series D funding of $90 million from Point72 Asset Management, Qualcomm Ventures, and Pavilion Capital.

== History ==
Netradyne was founded in 2015 by Avneesh Agrawal and David Julian, both former Qualcomm employees. The company initially worked on computer vision for autonomous driving. Then, it shifted focus in edge AI to assist human drivers in commercial fleets rather than fully replacing them with autonomous systems.

== Research & development ==
In 2018–2019, Netradyne conducted a pilot study in collaboration with the Robert Bosch Centre for Cyber-Physical Systems at the Indian Institute of Science and the car-rental company Zoomcar. The study analyzed approximately 100,000 trips totaling 10.6 million miles and 500,000 driving hours. According to reporting on the pilot, vehicles equipped with Driver i voice alerts showed a 14% reduction in accidents relative to a control group without the alerts activated. Improvements were also observed in metrics including speeding, hard braking, hard acceleration, and following distance. Drivers with higher GreenZone scores exhibited lower accident probability in the analyzed data.

Later from 2019 to 2020, the company again collaborated with Indian Institute of Science on a joint project with Bengaluru Metropolitan Transport Corporation to study the driving patterns of BMTC bus drivers and scored their safe-driving behaviour.

Publicly indexed peer-reviewed IEEE journals and conference papers that specifically evaluate the commercial Driver•i system are limited as of 2026. Though, current academic literature covers related areas such as driver monitoring, computer vision for advanced driver-assistance system and edge AI for smart transportation.

In 2024, the company was reported as top patent filers among deeptech startups in India.

== Operations ==
As of 2025, Netradyne reported serving several thousand commercial fleet customers and more than 450,000 vehicles. The company has stated that its systems have analyzed tens of billions of miles of real-world driving data. Customers operate in logistics, e-commerce, food and beverage, oil and gas, passenger transit, construction, and other sectors.

In 2021, Amazon began installing Netradyne cameras in its delivery vans. The deployment generated both claims of safety improvements and subsequent public discussion of continuous driver monitoring.

== Litigations ==
In August 2023, Netradyne was named as a defendant in a proposed class-action lawsuit in the United States District Court for the Southern District of California. The lawsuit alleged that its Driver•i system collected, stored, and shared drivers' facial biometric data without the notice and consent required by Illinois law. Publicly available sources do not show that Netradyne was found liable in the case.

== Awards ==
- Forbes America's Best Startup Employers 2025
- Motor Trader Commercial Industry Awards 2025
- FICCI Road Safety Award 2024.
- Netradyne deep tech startup filed most number of Patents by NASSCOM Report.
