= National Western Life =

American stock life insurance company

National Western Life Insurance Group, Inc.
- Traded as: Nasdaq: NWLI; Russell 2000 Component
- Industry: Life insurance Financial services
- Founded: 1956; 70 years ago
- Headquarters: Austin, Texas, U.S.
- Key people: Robert L. Moody; Ross R. Moody (CEO)
- Products: Life insurance Annuities; Financial products
- Number of employees: 275 Home Office Employees, 25,200 Domestic appointed independent agents/brokers
- Website: nationalwesternlife.com

National Western Life Insurance Company is an American stock life insurance company headquartered in Austin, Texas.

== History ==
The company was founded in 1956, and as of 2019 it has about 275 employees and 25,200 contracted independent agents and operates in 49 US states.

On 1 January 2020, National Western Life Insurance Company (NWLIC) confirmed the formation of The Sterling Group, a strategic partnership between itself and six large regional marketing organizations. Such strategic marketing agencies include Excel Advisors, CreativeOne, Financial Independence Group, Gradient Insurance Brokerage, Impact Partnership and M&O Marketing.

=== Products ===
The company offers individual universal life plans, term insurance plans, and whole life plans as well as offering annuities and life insurance products for foreign nationals.

=== Acquisition by Prosperity Life Group. ===
On 9 October 2023, the company announced an agreement where S. USA Life Insurance Company, Inc., an affiliate of Prosperity Life Group, will acquire National Western in an all-cash transaction valued at approximately $1.9 billion. The merger was completed in July 2024 with its stock being delisted from the Nasdaq.

== See also ==
- American National Insurance Company
