= Fortegra Group =

Multinational insurance company

- Formerly: Life of the South
- Company type: Private
- Founded: 1978
- Founder: Butch Houston
- Headquarters: Jacksonville, Florida
- Key people: Butch Houston (founder); Rick Kahlbaugh (CEO); Mark Rattner (CUO); Abbie Taylor (COO)
- Parent: Tiptree Holdings
- Website: fortegra.com

The Fortegra Group, formerly Life of The South, is a Jacksonville-based multinational insurance company founded in 1978. It is a subsidiary of Tiptree Holdings and has a presence in the United States and Europe.

== Overview ==
Life of the South was founded by Butch Houston in 1978 and later rebranded as Fortegra in 2008. The company started as a regional monoline Insurer in rural Georgia before relocating its headquarters to Jacksonville, Florida, in 1995. Its Initial Public Offering (IPO) began in 2007 when Summit Partners acquired 85% of its stake with US $100 million. In 2010, after Fortegra went public, Summit Partners held its majority stock of 62%, and then in 2014, it was sold to Tiptree Holdings for US $218 million. Since then, Fortegra Group has been a subsidiary of Tiptree Holdings.

With the acquisition of ProtectCELL in 2013 and Smart AutoCare and Defend Insurance Group in 2019 as subsidiaries, Fortegra expanded into specialty insurance, motor club, vehicle service contracts, warranty solutions, and premium financing, establishing its offices in Prague, Czech Republic, and London, the United Kingdom. In 2015, Fortegra started selling its products in Europe and later founded its Malta-based subsidiary, Fortegra Europe Insurance, in 2018. In 2020, The company launched its insurance subsidiary, Fortegra Specialty Insurance Group, providing excess and surplus lines products. In 2023, The Specialty Insurance Group partnered with Rockwood Programs and launched Bankers Defender, a program to assist bankers, brokers, and asset-based lenders..

Fortegra Group continued expanding in the Europe with the acquisition of a secondary intermediary group in the UK automotive industry, ITC Compliance, in 2022 and a majority stake in automotive product provider Premia Solutions in the following year. In 2022, Warburg Pincus, a private equity firm, bought a 24% stake in the company with US $200 million of investment.

In 2022, the financial performance of Fortegra included $1.2 billion in premium growth revenue and $2.0 billion in assets. As of 2024, Fortegra’s acquisitions also includes ProtectCell, Smart AutoCare, and Defend Insurance Group..
