= Reliance Partners =

- Type: Private
- Industry: Insurance Services
- Founded: 2009
- Headquarters: Chattanooga, Tennessee
- Number of locations: 9
- Key people: Andrew Ladebauche, Co-Founder, CEO; Chad Eichelberger, President; Laura Ann Howell, COO; Ronald Ramsey, CCO; Thom Albrecht, CRO; Jason Coleman,CMO; Ashley Hammonds, EVP, Business Development; Brandon Richards, CSO; Paul Stenmark, CFO
- Website: www.reliancepartners.com

Reliance Partners is an insurance agency offering commercial insurance products for the transportation and logistics industry. The private equity-backed company is based in Chattanooga, Tennessee, with eight additional office locations throughout the United States.

== History ==
Reliance Partners was founded in 2009 by Andrew Ladebauche and a group of Chattanooga logistics entrepreneurs. In August 2015, Reliance Partners appointed Andrew Ladebauche as CEO and hired Chad Eichelberger as president and COO. Eichelberger previously served as president of Access America Transport and president of Brokerage with Coyote Logistics. In November 2015, Laura Ann Howell joined the team as vice president after working for Thompson Appalachian Hardwoods where she also founded a trucking company and freight brokerage

In 2016, Reliance Partners Birmingham, Alabama, branch opened in December 2016. In October of 2017, logistics industry veteran Ronald Ramsey joined Reliance Partners as Chief Commercial Officer. A Chicago, Illinois, branch opened in November 2017 to expand market presence in the Midwest. Reliance Partners opened an office in Tampa, Florida, in April 2018. Branon Richards joined the executive leadership in 2018 as Chief Sales Officer and to lead the new Austin, Texas, branch. Reliance opened a Milwaukee, Wisconsin, office later the same year.

In 2020, Reliance Partners acquired the assets of Capacity Southeast, a Nashville, Tennessee–based retail insurance agency before announcing the acquisition of Ohio-based Borderless Coverage in 2021. The company also expanded their corporate footprint in Chattanooga, Tennessee, signing a lease with disability insurer, Unum. Later in 2021, Tennessee Governor Bill Lee announced grants totaling $1.3 million for training and the expansion of Reliance's recently opened Chattanooga headquarters would lead to the creation of 100 additional jobs.

In August 2022, Reliance Partners announced an investment from Carousel Capital, a Charlotte, North Carolina–based private equity firm. In October 2022, the company announced its intentions to open a new office location in Phoenix, Arizona. In January 2023, the Phoenix location opened up and is expected to have 60 employers by end of 2023.

== Awards and recognition ==
- "FreightTech Top 100"
- "Best Workplaces in Financial Services and Insurance" by Fortune Magazine
- "Great Places to Work"
- Inc. 5000 List
- "Top Insurance Employers"
