= American Family Insurance =

American private mutual company

American Family Mutual Insurance Company
- Type: Private
- Industry: Insurance and finance
- Founded: 1927; 99 years ago
- Headquarters: Madison, Wisconsin, U.S.,
- Key people: Bill Westrate (chairman, CEO)
- Products: Insurance (Auto, home, life, health, commercial)
- Revenue: ▲$17.1 billion USD (2019)
- Net income: ▲$455 million USD (2019)
- Total assets: ▲$31.1 billion USD (2019)
- Number of employees: 13,500 (2022)
- Website: www.amfam.com

American Family Mutual Insurance Company, also abbreviated as AmFam, is an American private mutual company headquartered in Madison, Wisconsin. It focuses on property, casualty, and auto insurance, and also offers commercial insurance, life, health, and homeowners coverage as well as investment and retirement-planning products. The company is listed in the Fortune 500, with reported revenues of over $9.5 billion in 2017.

== History ==
American Family Insurance was founded on October 3, 1927, when insurance salesman Herman Wittwer opened the doors of Farmers Mutual Insurance Company (not to be confused with the Farmers Insurance Group) in Madison, Wisconsin. At the time, the company's product was auto insurance and its target market was farmers. Wittwer believed that farmers represented lower insurance risks than urban drivers, as they drove less frequently and typically did not drive during winter months.

Over the course of a few years, Farmers Mutual expanded its market and product line to meet the changing needs of its customers. In 1963, Farmers Mutual changed its name to American Family Mutual Insurance Company to reflect its broader customer base. In March, 1995, American Family settled a redlining lawsuit, resulting in a $16 million payout to victims. The settlement was negotiated by the US Department of Justice and marked the first use of the federal Fair Housing Act of 1968 to counter discrimination in insurance; at the time it was the most costly insurance-company settlement ever for discrimination charges. In 2017, AmFam launched an ongoing campaign called DreamFearlessly. AmFam's company ambassadors use this as a hashtag on social media to help promote this campaign. The campaign encouraged consumers to express how they "dream fearlessly" for initiatives such as social justice, getting women into tech, and economic empowerment. Kathy Ireland and her team were brought on at an early point in the campaign to help with ambassador work. Blake Van Leer, a close supporter of the Society of Women Engineers, helped manage this campaign from its launch.

== Subsidiaries ==
Companies of the American Family Insurance Group include:

- American Family Mutual Insurance Company (AFMIC)
- American Family Brokerage, Inc. (AFBI)
- American Family Life Insurance Company (AFLIC) (Note: Not to be confused with AFLAC, American Family Life Assurance company)
- American Family Securities, LLC (AFS)
- American Standard Insurance Company (ASIC)
- American Standard Insurance Company of Ohio (ASICO; Ohio subsidiary; companion to American Standard Insurance Company of Wisconsin)
- Amfam.com, Inc. (AMFAM)
- Connect (formerly Ameriprise Auto & Home)
- HomeGauge, a provider of home inspection software.
- Homesite Group Incorporated
- Main Street America Insurance
- Moonrise, Inc.
- Networked Insights, an analytics company.
- American Family Insurance Claims Services (AFICS)

== Products ==
American Family insurance products include term, universal, and whole life insurance; personal and business auto insurance; personal umbrella insurance; home insurance; motorcycle, boat, motor home, snowmobile, and car insurance; business liability key policy and business policy package insurance; farm and ranch liability insurance; and travel, trip cancellation, and global medical insurance.

The company also offers a reward system for their insureds titled "Dreamkeep Rewards", which provides small to large rewards for completing various online tasks.

== Operating territory ==
The American Family Insurance Group is based in Madison, Wisconsin, and as of 2011 has four regional corporate headquarters in Minnetonka/Eden Prairie, Minnesota; Saint Joseph, Missouri; Denver, Colorado; and Columbus, Ohio.

== Significant milestones ==
Below is a list of milestones in the corporate history of American Family Mutual Insurance.

- 1927 Farmers Mutual Automobile Insurance Company was founded on Oct. 3 in Madison, Wis.
- 1938 Both premiums and assets surpassed $1 million.
- 1957 Farmers Mutual began to offer sickness and accident insurance.
- 1958 Company introduced homeowners insurance and opened American Family Life Insurance Company.
- 1959 Farmers Mutual entered the computer age with the RAMAC 305.
- 1961 American Standard began sales.
- 1962 Company began to offer farm owners insurance.
- 1963 Policyholders gave final approval to change the company's name to American Family Mutual Insurance Company.
- 1969 American Family Financial Services opened.
- 1975 Commercial Lines was introduced. American Family became the fifth-largest mutual auto insurer.
- 1981 Assets surpass $1 billion. American Family became the fourth-largest mutual auto insurance company.
- 1985 American Family Brokerage, Inc. opened.
- 1986 American Family posted its first $100 million operating gain.
- 1992 Policyholders' surplus exceeded $1 billion.
- 1994 American Family rolled out its catastrophe trailer. The company ranked as the 11th-largest property/casualty insurer.
- 1996 American Family first appeared on the Fortune 500 list at number 403.
- 1997 American Family became the 10th-largest property/casualty insurer in the nation. Assets surpassed $8 billion.
- 2001 American Family Securities, LLC introduced variable products. Assets for American Family Mutual Insurance Company exceeded $10 billion.
- 2001 Expanded into Utah and Idaho. American Family in 17 states across the U.S.
- 2002 American Family celebrated its 75th anniversary.
- 2003 American Family donated $10,000,000.00 towards construction of the future UW Children's Hospital, to be named American Family Children's Hospital.
- 2006 Expanded into Washington State. American Family in 18 states across the U.S.
- 2009 Expanded into Georgia. American Family in 19 states across U.S.
- 2012 American Family Insurance completed its acquisition of The General Insurance
- 2013 American Family Insurance completed its acquisition of Homesite Insurance
- 2016 Became the inaugural jersey sponsor of the 2017 MLS expansion team Atlanta United FC
- 2017 American Family Insurance completed its acquisition of HomeGauge and Networked Insights
- 2018 American Family completed merger with Florida-based insurance company, Main Street America Insurance
- 2019 American Family Insurance completed its acquisition of Ameriprise Auto & Home; the subsidiary was renamed Connect in 2020.
- 2021 American Family Insurance became the naming rights sponsor of the stadium of the Milwaukee Brewers, American Family Field.

== Awards ==
In 2010, National Safety Council selected American Family Insurance as a recipient of its Teen Driving Safety Leadership Award. Through its “Teen Safe Driver Program,” the company has provided, a video feedback program (using the DriveCam system) in which parents can watch the driving actions of their teens. The program was validated by scientists at the University of Iowa to produce a 70% reduction in risky driving behavior. In 2015, American Family was recognized as the most LGBT-friendly insurance company by Out Magazine because of its discounts targeted at same-sex couples.

== Ambassadors ==
American Family Insurance has an ambassador program with the stated mission to "inspire, protect and restore dreams". Notable ambassadors include:

- Kathy Ireland an American model, actress, author, and entrepreneur.
- Derek Jeter an American former professional baseball shortstop, businessman, and baseball executive.
- Christian Yelich is an American professional baseball outfielder for the Milwaukee Brewers of Major League Baseball.
- Drew and Jonathan Scott, are talents in television, authors, designers, and co-founders of Scott Brothers Global.
- Steve Stricker is an American professional golfer who plays on the PGA Tour and the PGA Tour Champions.
- J. J. Watt an American football defensive end for the Arizona Cardinals of the National Football League. (Former Ambassador)
- Brad Guzan an American soccer player who plays as a goalkeeper for Major League Soccer club Atlanta United FC (where the company serves as its main sponsor) and the United States national team.
- Kevin Durant an American professional basketball player for the Brooklyn Nets of the National Basketball Association. (Former Ambassador)
- John Legend an American singer, songwriter, producer, actor, and philanthropist. (Former Ambassador)

== Charitable contributions ==
=== American Family Children’s Hospital ===
On March 4, 2003, American Family Insurance announced a $10 million gift launching the campaign to create the American Family Children's Hospital at the University of Wisconsin Hospital and Clinics. From the initial gift, the amount grew by several millions more through employee, agent, and additional corporate donations. The hospital opened for business in September 2007.

=== United Way ===
In 2007, and again in 2008, employees donated close to $1 million to United Way.

== COVID-19 pandemic support ==
In April 2020, the company estimated the refunds to reflect $225 million in liquidity, contributing to the $200 million gain on personal insurance holders' premiums. American Family Insurance provided an additional COVID-19 pandemic mitigation premium of 10% on car policies.
