= Coaction Specialty Insurance =

American insurance company

Coordinates: 40.77134°N 74.50367°W

Coaction Specialty Insurance Group, Inc.
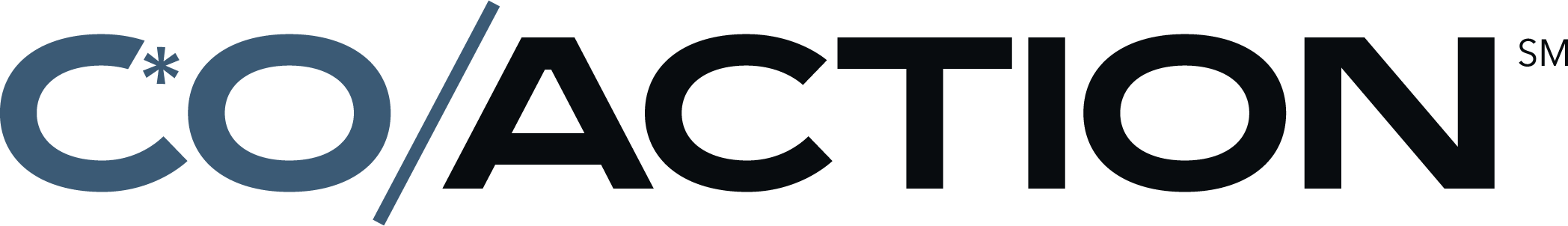
- Company type: Private
- Industry: Insurance
- Founded: New Jersey, United States (2009)
- Headquarters: Morristown, New Jersey, United States
- Key people: Jonathan Ritz (CEO)
- Owner: TowerBrook Capital Partners and Further Global
- Website: www.coactionspecialty.com

Coaction Specialty Insurance Group, Inc. is a privately owned property and casualty insurance company based in Morristown, New Jersey with offices in Glendale, California; and New York City. The company is owned by TowerBrook Capital Partners and Further Global Capital Management. Prior to April 2022, the company was known as ProSight Specialty Insurance Group, Inc..

As a part of their commercial media and entertainment services, ProSight was reported as insuring the highest-grossing concert of 2012. In October 2017, ProSight was downgraded from A to A− Financial Rating.

== Company history ==
In 2009, Joseph Beneducci founded ProSight Specialty Insurance Holdings, Inc. The name changed to ProSight Specialty Insurance Group, Inc. in November 2010.

Prior to founding ProSight, Beneducci was the CEO at Fireman's Fund Insurance Company. from January 2, 2007, to June 11, 2007. The specialty property and casualty insurance startup expanded quickly, and in 2010 it opened its Santa Rosa office location. The company now has locations in Morristown, New Jersey; London; Glendale, California; and New York City. In 2014, ProSight Specialty was featured on The 2014 Inc. 5000 list of the fastest-growing private American companies, ranking 3,204 with a $443.5 M revenue in 2013.

Prosight went public in July 2019 and was traded as PROS on the New York Stock Exchange NYSE.

In January 2021, TowerBrook Capital Partners and Further Global agreed to be acquire ProSight for $586 million. The transaction was closed in August 2021.

In April 2022, ProSight rebranded itself as Coaction Specialty Insurance Group.

== Products and services ==
In 2014, ProSight invested heavily in the use of in-cab camera technology as a part of their new insurance package for transportation customers. These cameras monitor and record events such as crashes, hard braking, and lane departures to improve safety and reduce the corresponding accident claims.

In May 2014, the firm announced an expansion of their services into the energy market with insurance programs focused on propane and fuel dealers, oil and gas contractors, and solar energy contractors.
