= UPC Insurance =

- Traded as: Nasdaq: UIHC
- Industry: Insurance
- Founded: 1999; 27 years ago
- Headquarters: St. Petersburg, Florida, United States
- Key people: John Forney (CEO)
- Products: Commercial insurance Residential insurance Homeowners’ insurance Flood insurance
- Revenue: US$723.9 million (2018)
- Website: www.upcinsurance.com

United Property & Casualty Insurance Company, Inc. (UPC Insurance) is an American property and casualty insurance company with headquarters in Florida. It writes commercial, residential, homeowners’, and flood insurance policies in several coastal states.

As of 2019, UPC Insurance had about 159,170 active policies, accounting for just over 2.5 percent market share.

== History ==
UPC Insurance was founded in 1999 in St. Petersburg, Florida.

In 2012, John Forney was named CEO. Forney is a former U.S. Army infantry officer and graduate of Ranger School. Before joining UPC Insurance, he served in several capacities at Raymond James Financial.

In 2014, UPC Insurance purchased the AAA Auto South building, which had been owned by the Peninsula Motor Club Inc. since 1987, as its new headquarters. The company tried to acquire Family Security Holdings LLC but never completed the $9 million deal. Also in 2014, Judy Copechal, Chief Underwriting Officer at UPC Insurance, was named as one of the Top 10 Women in Insurance Leadership by Insurance Networking News.

In 2015, UPC Insurance acquired Interboro Insurance Company, a property and casualty insurance company authorized in New York, Alabama, South Carolina, Washington, D.C., and Louisiana, from Interboro, LLC for $57 million. The company also participated in the Texas Windstorm Insurance Association (TWIA) Depopulation Program.

In 2017, UPC Insurance merged with American Coastal Insurance Co. Journey Insurance Company offers homeowners and commercial residential property insurance through independent agents and brokers in Florida, South Carolina, and Texas. It received an “A−“ Financial Strength Rating and “a-“ Issuer Credit Rating from A.M. Best.

In 2018, UPC Insurance announced plans to build another new headquarters in downtown St. Petersburg, the first new office construction in the area since the Duke Energy Florida headquarters in 2007. The company also collaborated with R.J. Kiln & Co., a subsidiary of Tokio Marine Kiln, to form a property and casualty insurance subsidiary called Journey Insurance Company.

In 2019, UPC Insurance reported first-quarter catastrophe losses of $13 million after-tax due to several catastrophic events, including the Brevard County hailstorm, as well as possible loss creep from Hurricane Irma and Hurricane Michael.

UPC announced in August 2022 that they would leave the Florida Property Insurance market with a plan to cancel all remaining policies May 31, 2023 before the start of the hurricane season on June 1. Hurricane Ian struck Florida the following month near Fort Myers. UPC policies were concentrated in Southwest Florida and the company experienced 25,000 claims. The company initially projected losses of $660 million but by the end of 2022, losses were revised to $864 million. When UPC notified Florida's Office of Insurance Regulation of their dire financial situation, the Insurance Commissioner sent a letter to CFO Jimmy Patronis to seek court approval to place UPC into receivership. In early February 2023 Slide Insurance assumed 72,000 of the 135,000 UPC policies. Less than a week later, UPC was declared insolvent.
