= Networked Insights =

American analytics software company

- Company type: Venture
- Industry: Data analytics
- Founded: 1 January 2006
- Founder: Dan Neely
- Headquarters: Chicago, Illinois, U.S.
- Number of employees: 150

Networked Insights Inc. is an analytics software company headquartered in Chicago, IL with additional offices in New York City and Madison, Wisconsin. Founded in 2006 by entrepreneur Dan Neely, the company aims to help its customers make marketing and advertising more effective by capturing and analyzing social media conversations from blogs, internet forums, microblogs like Twitter and social networks like Facebook.

Networked Insights’ technology platform, called 'Kairos', includes online analytical processing and social media measurement tools. Its software as a service analytics platform combines user-defined logic with multiple sources of network data and ability for intelligence gathering and analysis across open social media and private customer networks. The Networked Insights platform discerns engagement using semantic analysis around specific topics and themes relevant to a brand, differing from traditional social media monitoring in that it doesn't require users to manually read through content.
