= The General (insurance) =

Automotive Insurance Company

The General Insurance

- Company type: Subsidiary
- Industry: Insurance
- Founded: 1963; 63 years ago
- Headquarters: Nashville, Tennessee, United States
- Area served: United States
- Key people: Tiku Raval
- Products: Non-Standard Auto insurance
- Number of employees: 1,300
- Parent: Sentry Insurance
- Website: thegeneral.com

The General Insurance, doing business as The General, founded in 1963, is a licensed insurance agency that is a subsidiary of Sentry Insurance that focuses on auto insurance. In 2012, the company was acquired by American Family Insurance; The General brand remained as a separate brand. In 2024 Sentry Insurance announced that it would acquire The General from American Family Insurance for $1.7 Billion, and the acquisition finalized on January 1, 2025.

The General specializes in insuring drivers who are considered "high risk" whose car insurance premiums are typically more expensive. Tiku Raval is the current president of The General.

== History ==
The General began selling insurance in 1963, under the company name Permanent General Agency. Later, the name was changed to Permanent General Assurance Corporation (PGAC), and in 2012, it was announced that Permanent General and all affiliated companies will unify under the one brand name "The General."

Since 2016, retired professional basketball player Shaquille O'Neal has endorsed and appeared in numerous commercials for the company.

== Operating territory ==
The General is based in Nashville, Tennessee, and has several physical store operations throughout the state of Louisiana. The General offers coverage in 47 states excluding Alaska, Hawaii, and Michigan.

== Awards ==
Award	Campaign	Category	Results	Year
Clio	The General Sound Studio	Music	3- Bronze 1- Shortlist	2025
Effies	The General Sound Studio	Digital - Services - Influencer Marketing	Silver Winner	2024
Effies	The General Sound Studio	Insurance	Finalist	2024
Effies	The Break Campaign	Insurance	Finalist	2024
WARC	The General Sound Studio	Partnerships/Sponsorships	Finalist	2024
Shorty Awards	The General Sound Studio	Music & Dance	Winner (Highest Award Level)	2024
Shorty Awards	The General Sound Studio	Insurance	Gold Mention (Second Award Level)	2024
The Tellys	The General Sound Studio	Social Series - Products/Services	Gold Winner	2024
The Tellys	The General Sound Studio	Social Series – Automotive	Silver Winner	2024
The Tellys	The Break, presented by The General	Sports - Branded Content	Silver Winner	2024
Clios	The General Sound Studio	Social Media: User Generated Content - Product/Service	Short Listed	2024
Chicago Advertising Federation	The General Sound Studio	Cross Platform: Online/Interactive	Silver Winner	2024
One Show	The General Sound Studio	Experiential & Immersive: Brand Installations	Merti Award	2024
One Show	The General Sound Studio	Radio & Audio First: Brand Partnerships	Merti Award	2024
District 6 Advertising Federation	The General Sound Studio	Cross Platform > Online/ Interactive Campaign > 047 - Online/Interactive Campaign	Gold Winner	2024
Cannes Lions	The General Sound Studio	Audio & Radio Social Behaviour & Cultural Insight	Silver	2024
Cannes Lions	The General Sound Studio	Audio & Radio Consumer Services/ B2B	Bronze	2024
Sabre Awards	The Break, presented by The General	Best Use of YouTube	Winner	
Sabre Awards	The Break, presented by The General	Content Creation for Media Sites (Earned)	Winner	
Fortune Best Workplaces			Rank	Year
For Women (Large)			#60 #91	2021 2022
For Millennials (Large)			#89	2021
In Financial Services & Insurance			#32 #34	2021 2022
Best Place to Work
General Certification				2018-2024

In 2012, The General and Ken Roberts Productions received three Telly Awards for television commercials in the Animation category. A Silver Award was won for the "Baseball" commercial, and Bronze Awards were won for "Football" and "Snowboard". In 2019, The General was certified a "Great Place to Work".
