= Fuel management =

Systems used to maintain fuel consumption

Fuel-management systems are used to maintain, control and monitor fuel consumption and stock in any type of industry that uses transport, including rail, road, water and air, as a means of business. Fuel-management systems are designed to effectively measure and manage the use of fuel within the transportation and construction industries. They are typically used for fleets of vehicles, including railway vehicles and aircraft, as well as any vehicle that requires fuel to operate. They employ various methods and technologies to monitor and track fuel inventories, fuel purchases and fuel dispensed. This information can be then stored in computerized systems and reports generated with data to inform management practices. Online fuel management is provided through the use of web portals to provide detailed fueling data, usually vis a vis the back end of an automated fuel-management system. This enables consumption control, cost analysis and tax accounting for fuel purchases.

There are several types of fuel-management systems. Card-based fuel-management systems typically track fuel transactions based on a fueling credit card and the associated driver PIN. Reports can then be generated based on fuel consumption by driver, and data can be directly downloaded. On-site fuel-management systems may employ fleet refueling services or bulk fuel tanks at the site. Fuel is tracked as it is pumped into vehicles, and on-site storage levels can be managed.

Some fuel companies offer total fuel-management systems whereby they provide elements of a card-based system along with on-site fuel delivery and refueling services. Mobile fuel management refers to a fleet of fuel trucks or tankers which provide fuel supply to commercial fleets of trucks or construction equipment. May involve combining RFID technology to identify equipment and automated fuel management to append the details of each transaction to a unique piece of equipment. By refueling vehicles in the evening when they are not in use, the company can conserve man-hours as the operators do not refuel and the vehicles do not require additional fuel to travel to the refueling station. They may also employ more sophisticated systems that utilize remote data collection to gather specific technical information about the vehicle usage and performance characteristics such as mileage, hours of operation and engine idling time.

The increasing use of bio-fuel has introduced another challenge in fuel management. With greater water content, there will be a risk of microbial growth – depending on the storage conditions, the fuel quality will deteriorate over time, leading to clogged filters and loss of productivity.

Tank manufacturers have introduced fuel filtering and cleansing packs which recirculate the tank contents through a series of filters and ultraviolet treatment to kill bacteria. Data from fuel quality instrumentation can be streamed to allow remote monitoring over Internet connections.

== Hardware ==
There have been, to date, five recognizable generations of fuel-management system:

First generation : A bank of a number of electro-mechanical counters, pulsed by a shaft-driven encoder fitted to the pump. The correct counter is selected by the use of an encoded key. These types of systems were available throughout the 1960s superseded by more sophisticated systems in the late 1970s.

Second generation : A self-contained, electronic and/or microprocessor-controlled fuel-island control systems which has an ID reader (key, card, RFID etc.) to identify the vehicle and driver, a means of controlling a pump, a means of measuring the fuel delivered, and usually, a means of reporting fuel drawn by a vehicle. The fleet list is usually input using an integral keypad or an office based console. These systems were either fitted with integral printers or permanently hard-wired to back office consoles that provided simple reporting and printouts, these system types were superseded by the proliferation of low cost PC's.

Third generation : A fuel-island control system similar to a second-generation system, which is either periodically, or permanently connected to a PC which is used to report on the fuellings and input the fleet information. These systems also provided the first "networked" systems, usually fitted with a dial up modem within the island terminal, networks could be polled around usually at 12pm onwards to download the days transaction to a central PC and controller.

Fourth generation : The fuel-island controller is fully connected directly to a central Internet-based server which is updated in real time. All fleet information and transactions are held on the central server. Connection is made from the fuel island to the server using GPRS, or can use the operators own network using a Wi-Fi or Cabled Network Link. Continuous Internet connection can not be guaranteed and hence any fourth-generation system must have a fall-back white/black list, usually built in real time from previous authorizations.

The principal advantages of a real-time system are that site operation can be monitored in real time, stock figures are always current, and, with integrated tank gauging, fuel theft from tanks and short deliveries can be identified immediately.

The advent of real-time systems has much reduced the requirements of having printed reports, usually circulated and ignored, in favour of users looking at live and current data presented as and when they need it. Having users interact with live and relevant data, rather than simply viewing lists of out of date information encourages a more active view of fuel management than was previously possible, so that active, timely interventions take place generating fuel savings - which is the entire point of the system. The challenge facing manufacturers currently is to make real time data analysis tools which are relevant to the industry and are quick and simple to use by any operator with no technical background.

There are several ways to identify the vehicle being fuelled, but most often an RFID tag will be used as they are low cost and reliable. An obvious ID method would be for the driver to present their mobile phone using near field ID, but this would only be possible on diesel sites given the restrictions on using mobile phones on petrol, CNG and LNG installations.

The latest fourth generation systems will do away with the requirement for the driver to type in the vehicle's mileage by having real time links to any telematics that the vehicle is using to read the vehicles mileage in real time.

== ID Devices/Methods ==
To identify the vehicle/equipment being fuelled, some sort of ID token is normally used. On the most simple systems, this may be an ID or registration number typed in through a keypad, but as this is open to abuse, offering no real fuel security, a physical token is most often used. Some of the most common are listed here :

RFID Tags : By far the most common type of ID token as it is the most reliable in the sometimes harsh environment where fuelling takes place. Using an RFID tag means there are no openings required in the fuel-management terminal and hence best protection from water or dust ingress. RFID tags are low cost and very reliable and the reader requires no ongoing maintenance.

Magnetic Cards : Often seen as a saving over purchasing RFID tags, a fleet already using fuel cards will use these same cards at the fuel-island terminal. The exposed nature of most fuel islands is not the ideal environment for the use of fuel cards so reliability may be compromised and hence perceived savings not achieved. If the readers are regularly cleaned, then an acceptable level of reliability may be achieved.

Dallas Touch Keys / IButtons : A popular alternative to RFID tags, these keys have two electrical contacts which need to be touched to a reader. These keys are very reliable with only minimal maintenance of the key reader required.

Nozzle Based Technologies : In this system, the fuelling nozzle has a reader mounted on it, or integrated within the nozzle itself. When the refuelling nozzle is inserted into the vehicle filler neck, or connected as part of a dry break fuel system, the vehicle ID is read. This vehicle identification is then transmitted back to the FM terminal using wires or RFID technology. The advantage of this type of system is that the fuelling nozzle must be fully inserted or connected to the vehicle before fuel starts to flow, and fuelling stops if the nozzle is removed, making on-site fuel theft much more difficult. Unfortunately, it does nothing to stop off-site fuel theft, and so should be coupled with anti-syphoning technologies to complete the system.

Hand Held Scanners : These are especially useful for Mobile Refuelling Solutions where the fueller is some distance from the pumping unit (eg Bowser) when fuelling takes place. The Hand Held Unit has either an RFID, Near field or Barcode Reader to read a tag or barcode permanently attached to the equipment to be fuelled. The HHU then uses a radio link to transmit the ID data back to the bowser where it is validated and the pump started. The fueller is at the point of delivery and hence can control the hose, minimising spillage issues.

Bluetooth technology: Vehicles may be retrofitted with a Bluetooth transponder to allow for both vehicle identification and data transfer from the vehicle's CAN network.

== Software ==
Fuel-oil management system (FOMS) is a recent development in the field of electric power by which the fuel oil level in any power plant or any industry can be monitored and controlled using programmable logic controller and supervisory control and data acquisition.

== See also ==
- Fleet management
- Fuel
- Fuel oil
- Marine fuel management
