= Independent insurance agent =

People who sell a variety of insurance and financial products

Independent insurance agents, also known as insurance sales agents or "producers", typically sell a variety of insurance and financial products, including property insurance and casualty insurance, life insurance, health insurance, disability insurance, and long-term care insurance.

Property and casualty insurance agents sell insurance policies that protect individuals and businesses from financial loss resulting from automobile accidents, fire, theft, storms, and other events that can damage property. For businesses, property and casualty insurance can also cover injured Workers Compensation Insurance, product liability claims, or medical malpractice claims.

Independent insurance agents typically represent a number of insurance companies, or "carriers", and sell the products that most appropriately meet the needs of their clients. Independent agents typically are very well trained and knowledgeable of the complexities of the insurance market and insurance law. Their expertise allows them to advise their clients about appropriate amounts of insurance and insurance coverages for their particular needs. Often, independent insurance agents will work with insurance intermediaries, who obtain quotes from multiple insurance providers and pass them off to the independent agent. Working with an insurance intermediary service allows the independent agent to review many quotes and offer their clients the best policy options available. For their efforts, independent agents are paid a commission (remuneration).

In addition to insurance policies, agents often sell mutual funds, annuities, and products that address wealth management, retirement and estate planning. Independent agents must be licensed by the states in which they sell insurance and financial products.

There are a number of major trade organizations that support the interests and needs of the independent insurance agent, including Agents For Change, The National Organization of Life and Health Agents (NOLHA), the Independent Insurance Agents & Brokers of America (The Big "I"), and the National Association of Professional Insurance Agents (PIA).

Independent agents are independent contractors for the insurance companies they represent. Several companies may authorize the agent to sell for them, but the agent remains an independent businessperson. While the agent collects commissions, they do not collect a salary from the companies they represent. On average, independent agents work with thirteen property and casualty and six life and health insurance companies on a regular basis.

Independent agents own and control their accounts, policy records, and renewals. If an independent agent’s contract with a particular insurance company terminates, the agent retains the rights to active accounts and may place them with another insurer.

Competition exists between exclusive agents and independent agents. Exclusive agents, who are salaried employees of the insurance company, write a majority of the personal lines business. However, because of the complexities involved in commercial risks, independent agents capture approximately 80 percent of the commercial lines market. It is having access to multiple markets that gives independent agents a competitive advantage in commercial lines.

To add to an independent agent’s competition pool, many insurance companies are direct competitors to the agents they appoint. For example, Progressive Insurance spends nearly $300 million a year in advertising directly to the public. Yet, Progressive is the country’s largest writer of private passenger auto insurance through the independent agent distribution channel.
