= Flea market =

Street market or bazaar for used items

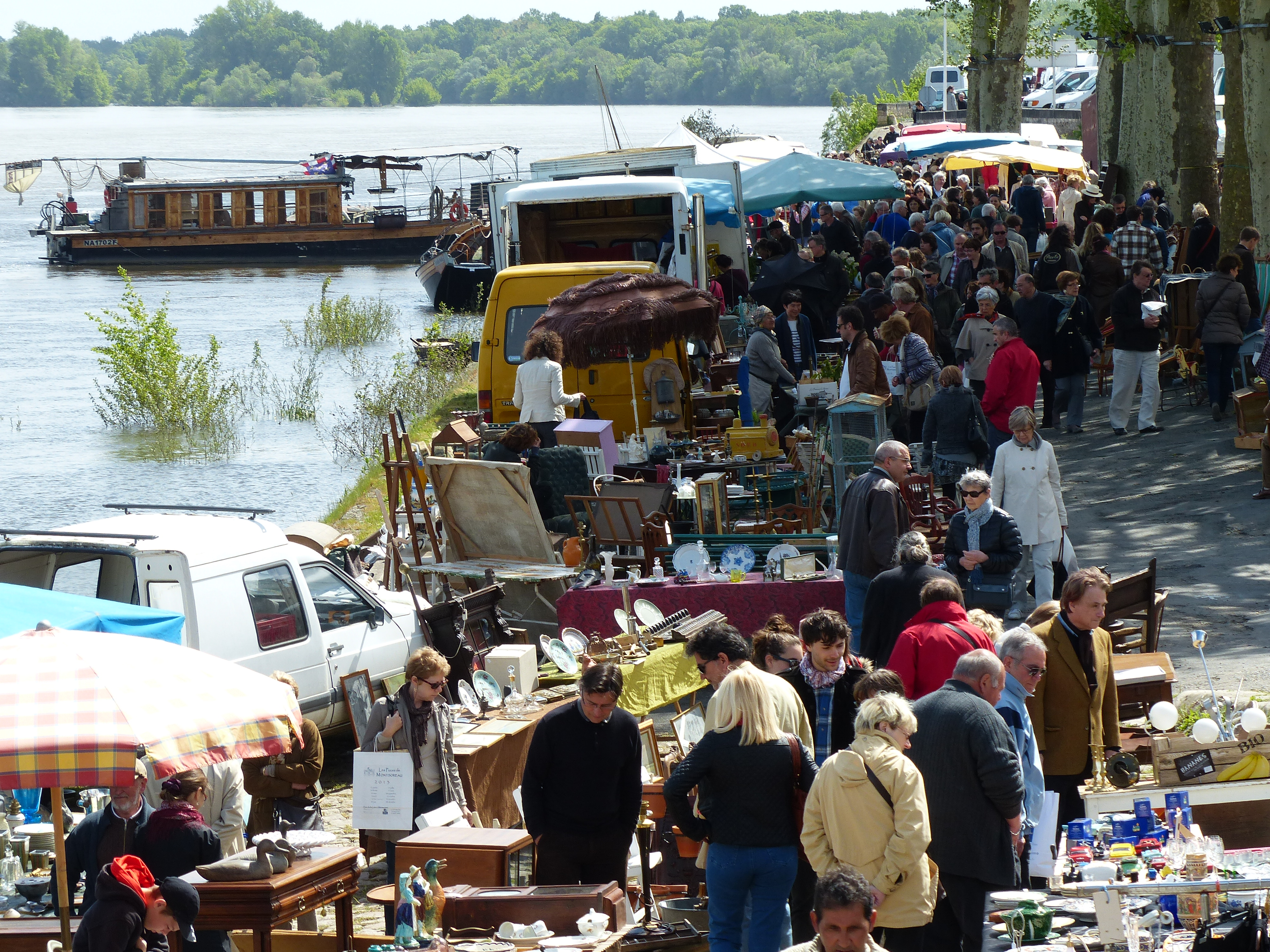
Montsoreau Flea Market, Loire Valley, France

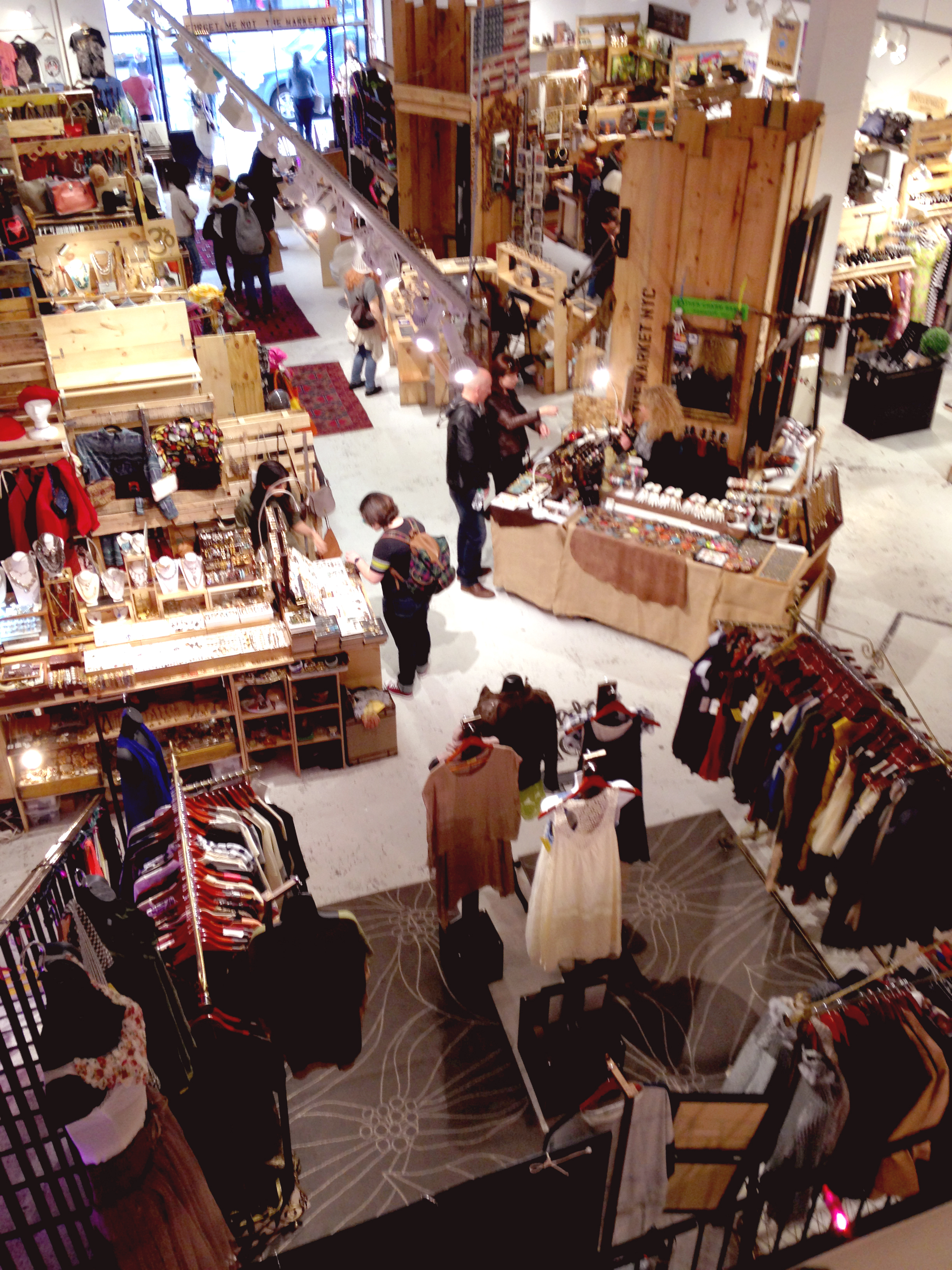
The Market NYC, an artists', designers', vintage and an indoor flea market in New York City

A flea market (or swap meet) is a type of street market that provides space for vendors to sell (generally previously owned) goods. This type of market is often seasonal. However, in recent years there has been the development of 'formal' and 'casual' markets which divides a fixed-style market (formal) with long-term leases and a seasonal-style market with short-term leases. Consistently, there tends to be an emphasis on sustainable consumption whereby items such as used goods, collectibles, antiques and vintage clothing can be purchased, in an effort to combat climate change and fast fashion.

Flea market vending is distinguished from street vending in that the market alone, and not any other public attraction, brings in buyers. There are a variety of vendors: some part-time who consider their work at flea markets a hobby due to their possession of an alternative job; full-time vendors who dedicate all their time to their stalls and collection of merchandise and rely solely on the profits made at the market. Vendors require skill in following retro and vintage trends, as well as selecting merchandise which connects with the culture and identity of their customers.

In the United States, the National Association of Flea Markets was established in 1998, which provides various resources for sellers, suppliers and buyers and also provides a means for suppliers and sellers to communicate and form affiliations.

== Origin of the term ==
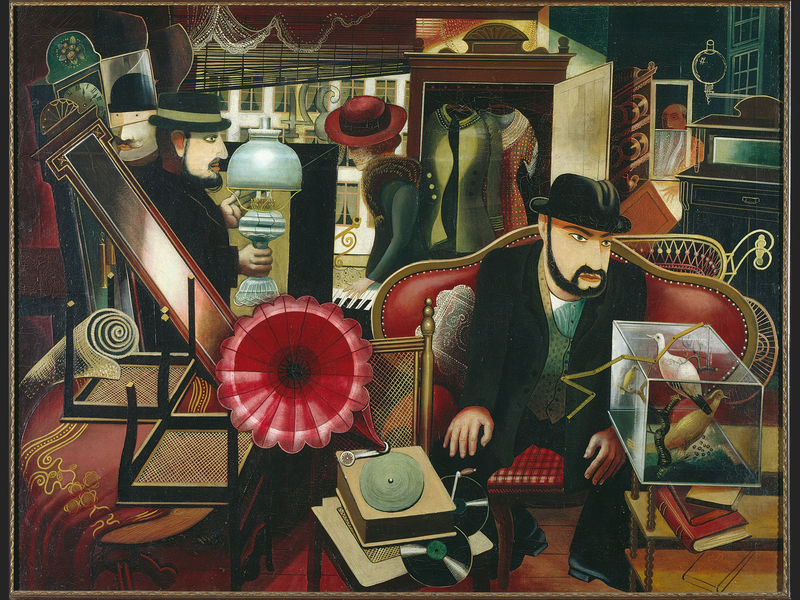
Trödelladen (junk shop) by Ernst Thoms, 1926

Flea market is a common English calque from the French marché aux puces, which literally translates to "market with fleas", labelled as such because the items sold were previously owned and worn, likely containing fleas. The first reference to this term appeared in two conflicting stories about a location in Paris in the 1860s which was known as the "marché aux puces".

The traditional and most-publicized story is in the article "What Is a Flea Market?" by Albert LaFarge in the 1998 winter edition of Today's Flea Market magazine:

There is a general agreement that the term 'Flea Market' is a literal translation of the French marché aux puces, an outdoor bazaar in Paris, France, named after those pesky little parasites of the order Siphonaptera (or "wingless bloodsucker") that infested the upholstery of old furniture brought out for sale.

The second story appeared in the book Flea Markets, published in Europe by Chartwell Books, reading in its introduction:

In the time of the Emperor Napoleon III, the imperial architect Haussmann made plans for the broad, straight boulevards with rows of square houses in the center of Paris, along which army divisions could march with much pompous noise. The plans forced many dealers in second-hand goods to flee their old dwellings; the alleys and slums were demolished. These dislodged merchants were, however, allowed to continue selling their wares undisturbed right in the north of Paris, just outside the former fort, in front of the gate Porte de Clignancourt. The first stalls were erected in about 1860. The gathering together of all these exiles from the slums of Paris was soon given the name "marché aux puces", meaning "flea market", later translation.

The Saint-Ouen flea market in Paris is the world's largest concentration of antique dealers and second-hand dealers, drawing around 11 million visitors per year.

== Regional names ==
In the United States, an outdoor swap meet is the equivalent of a flea market. However, an indoor swap meet is the equivalent of a bazaar, a permanent, indoor shopping center open during normal retail hours, with fixed booths or storefronts for the vendors.

Different English-speaking countries use various names for flea markets. In Australian English, they are also called 'trash and treasure markets', while the term 'swap meet' is used for a market held primarily to sell car- and motorcycle parts and automobilia. In Philippine English, the word is tianggê from the word tianguis via Mexican Spanish coming from Nahuatl. Despite common misconception, it is not derived from Hokkien. The word supplants the indigenous term talipapâ. In India, it is known as gurjari or shrukawadi bazaar or even as juna bazaar in Pune.

In the United Kingdom, they are known as car boot sales if the event takes place in a field or car park, as the vendors will sell goods from the boot (or 'trunk' in American English) of their car. If the event is held indoors, such as a school or church hall, then it is usually known as either a jumble sale, or a bring and buy sale. In Quebec and France, they are often called Marché aux puces (literally "flea market"), while in French-speaking areas of Belgium, the name brocante or vide-grenier is normally used.

In German, there are many words in use but the most common word is "Flohmarkt", literally meaning "flea market". The same applies to Dutch "vlooienmarkt", Swedish "loppmarknad" and Finnish "kirpputori". In the predominantly Cuban/Hispanic areas of South Florida, they are called [el] pulguero ("[the] flea store") from pulga, the Spanish word for fleas. In the Southern part of Andalusia, due to the influence of Gibraltar English, they are known as "piojito", which means "little louse". In Chile they can be called persas or mercados persa ("persian market") and ferias libres, if mostly selling fruit and vegetables. In Argentina they are most often known as "feria artesanal" (artisan's or street fair) or "feria americana" (American fair); the latter name is likely to have been inspired by its United States counterpart.

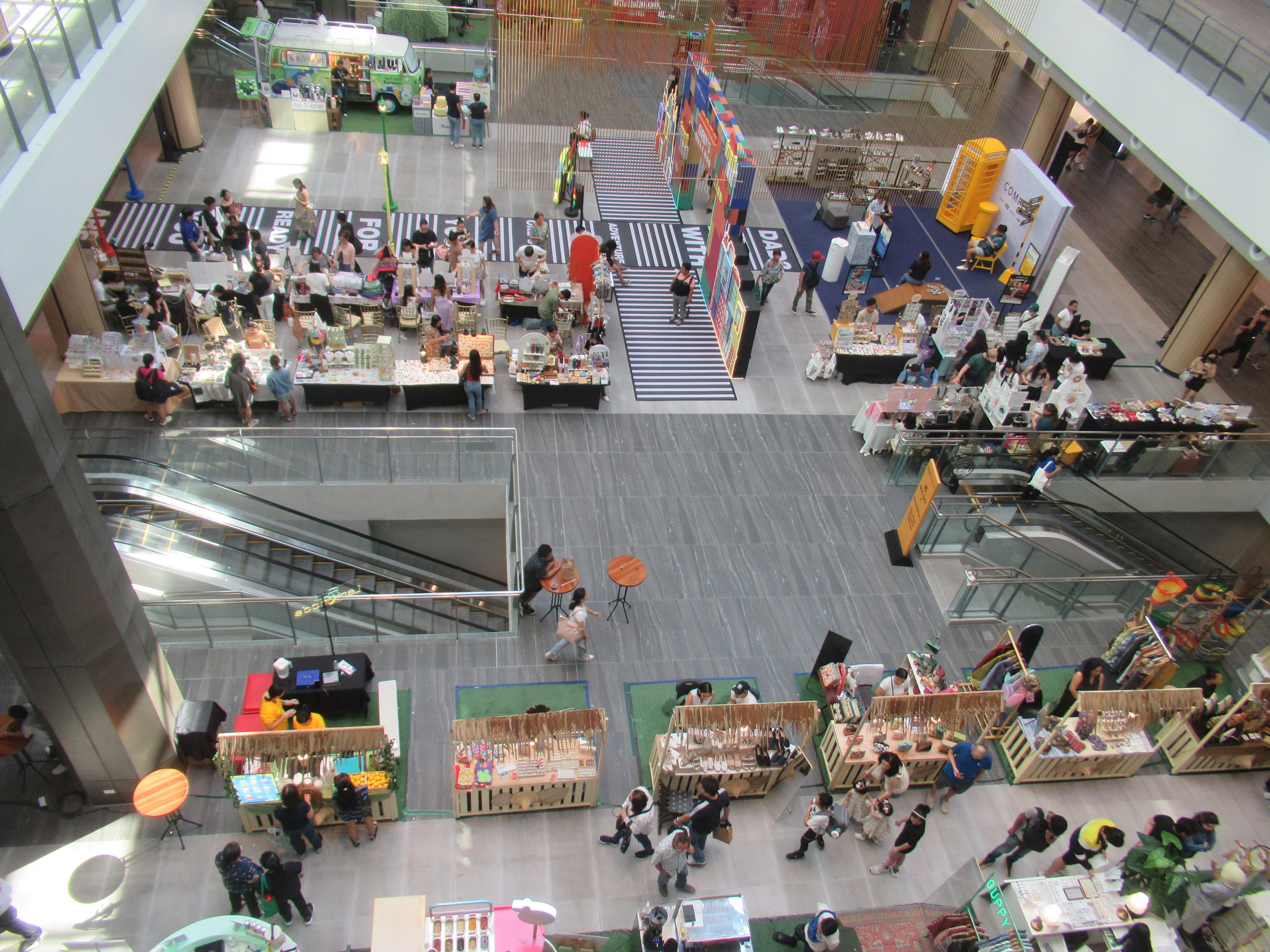
One Ayala "Tiangge"

In Moroccan Darija, the term for "flea market" is جوطية juṭiyya, which either derives from French jeter or jetable (throwable), or is an older term derived from جوقة juqa meaning "gathering of people". An ancient village on the bank of Sebou River by the name جوطة "Juta" may have been a big medieval market.

In the Philippines, "Tiangges" or bazaar shopping is famous in spacious markets like Divisoria, Greenhills, and Baclaran. These settings feature rows of stalls containing displays of various items such as clothes, accessories, and gadgets at notably low prices.

== Gallery ==
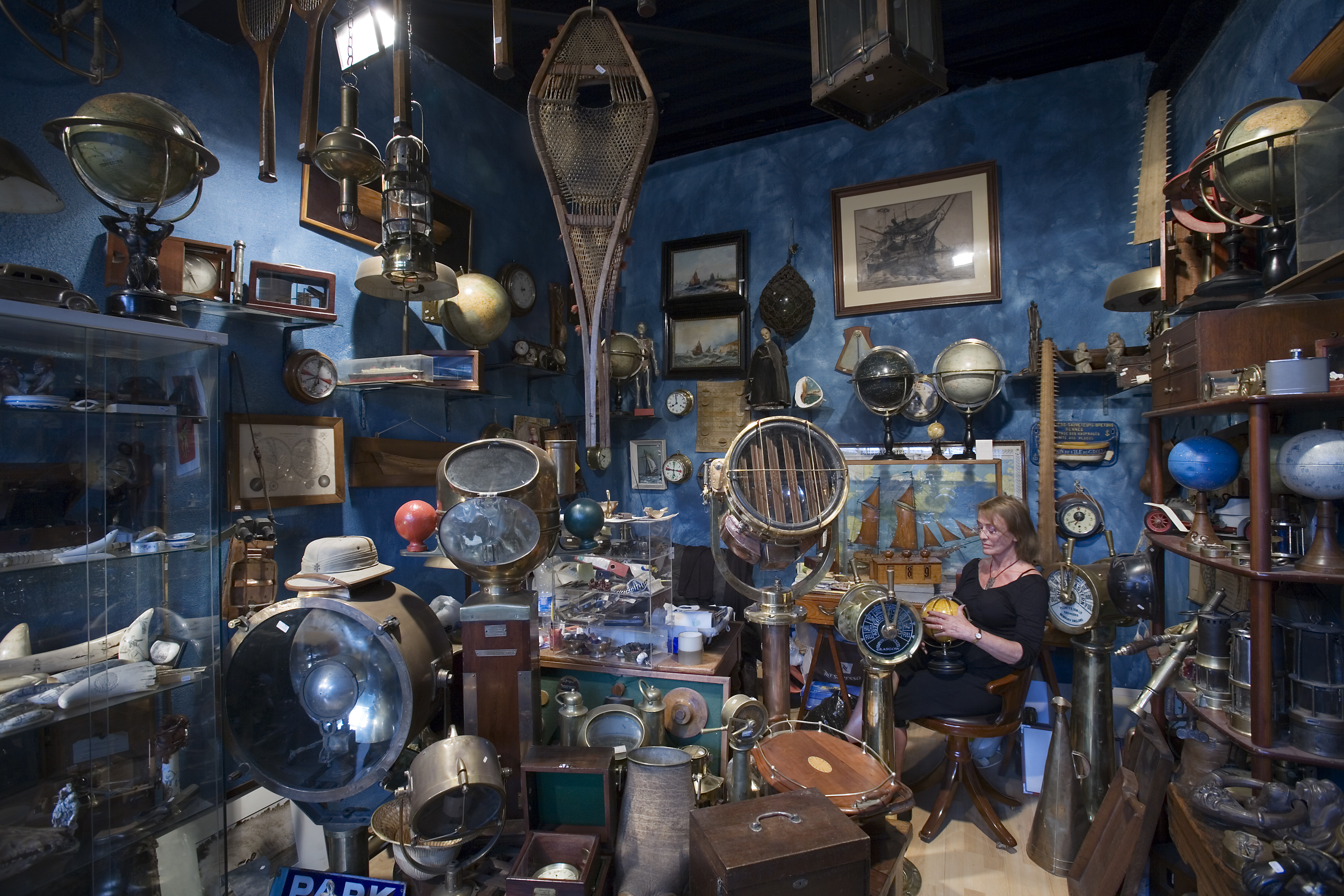
A vintage travel gear seller at Marché Dauphine in the Saint-Ouen flea market

A flea market in Frankfurt

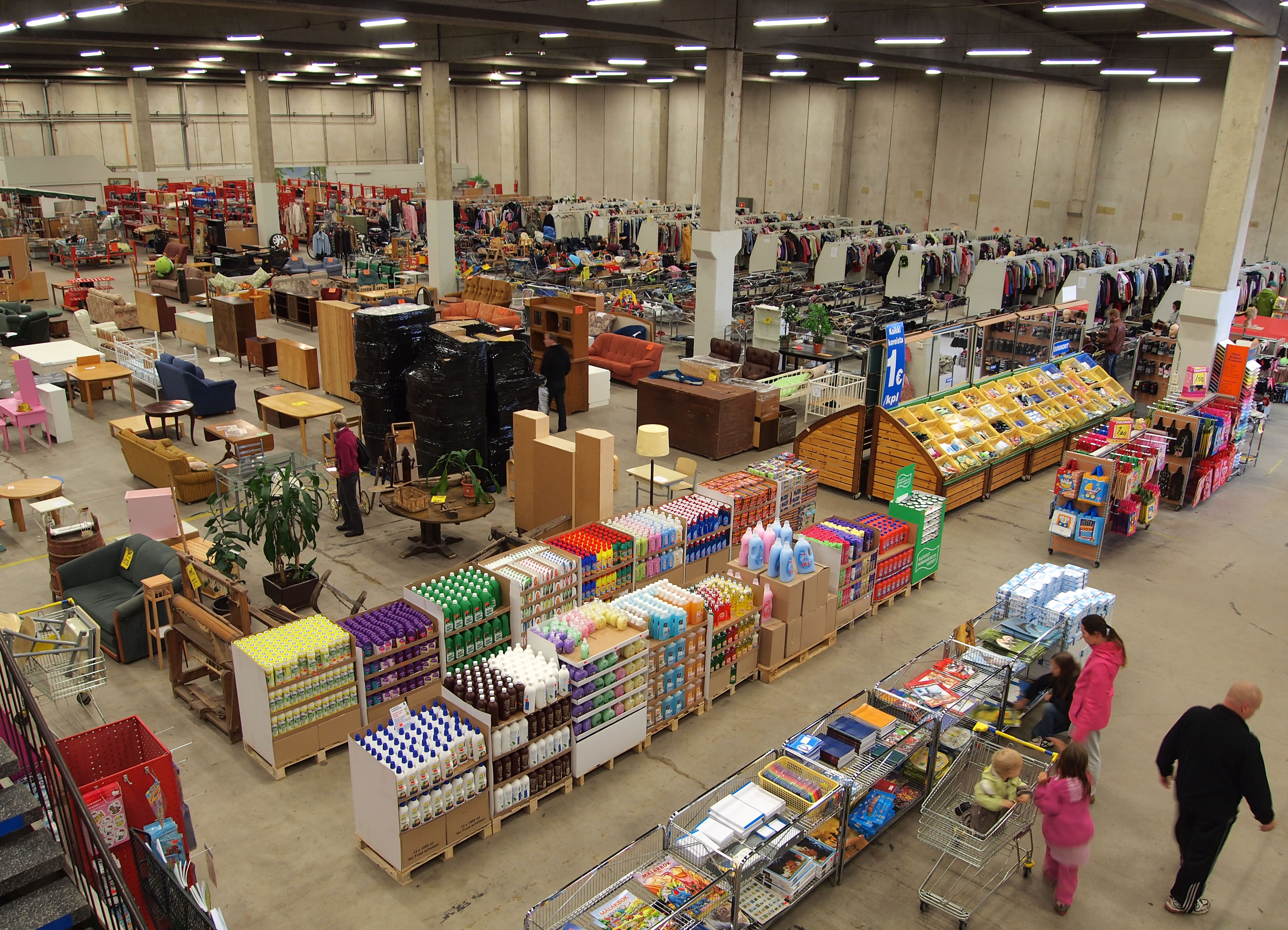
Flea market in Seppälä, Jyväskylä, Finland

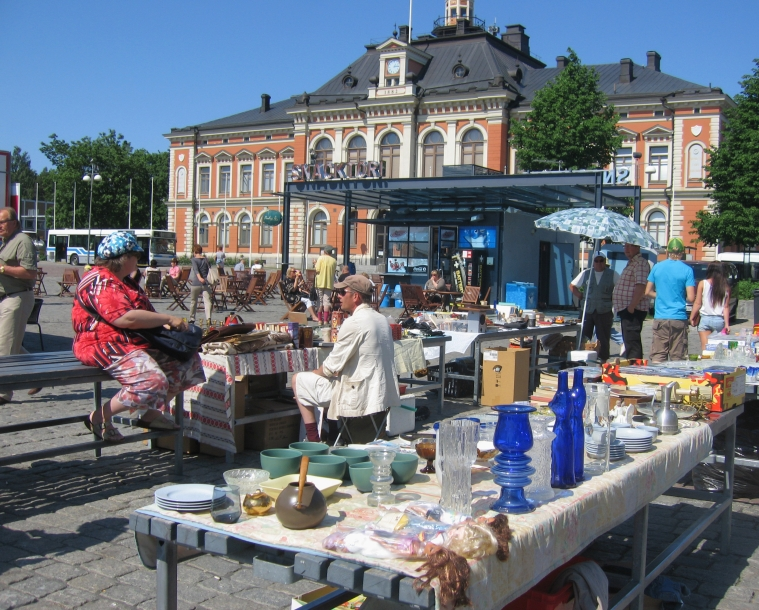
A flea market on the Kuopio Market Square in Finland

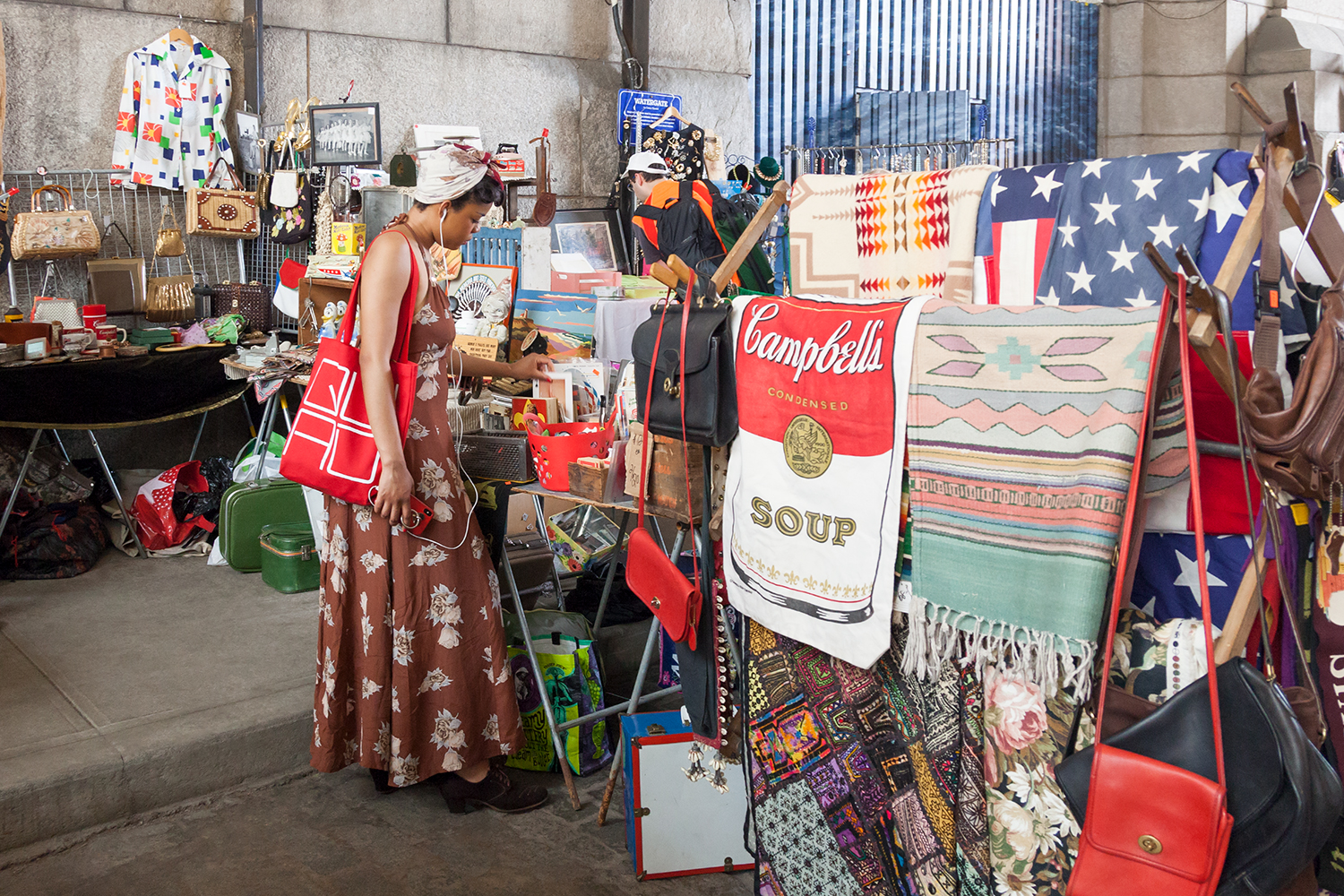
Vendor display at the Brooklyn Flea

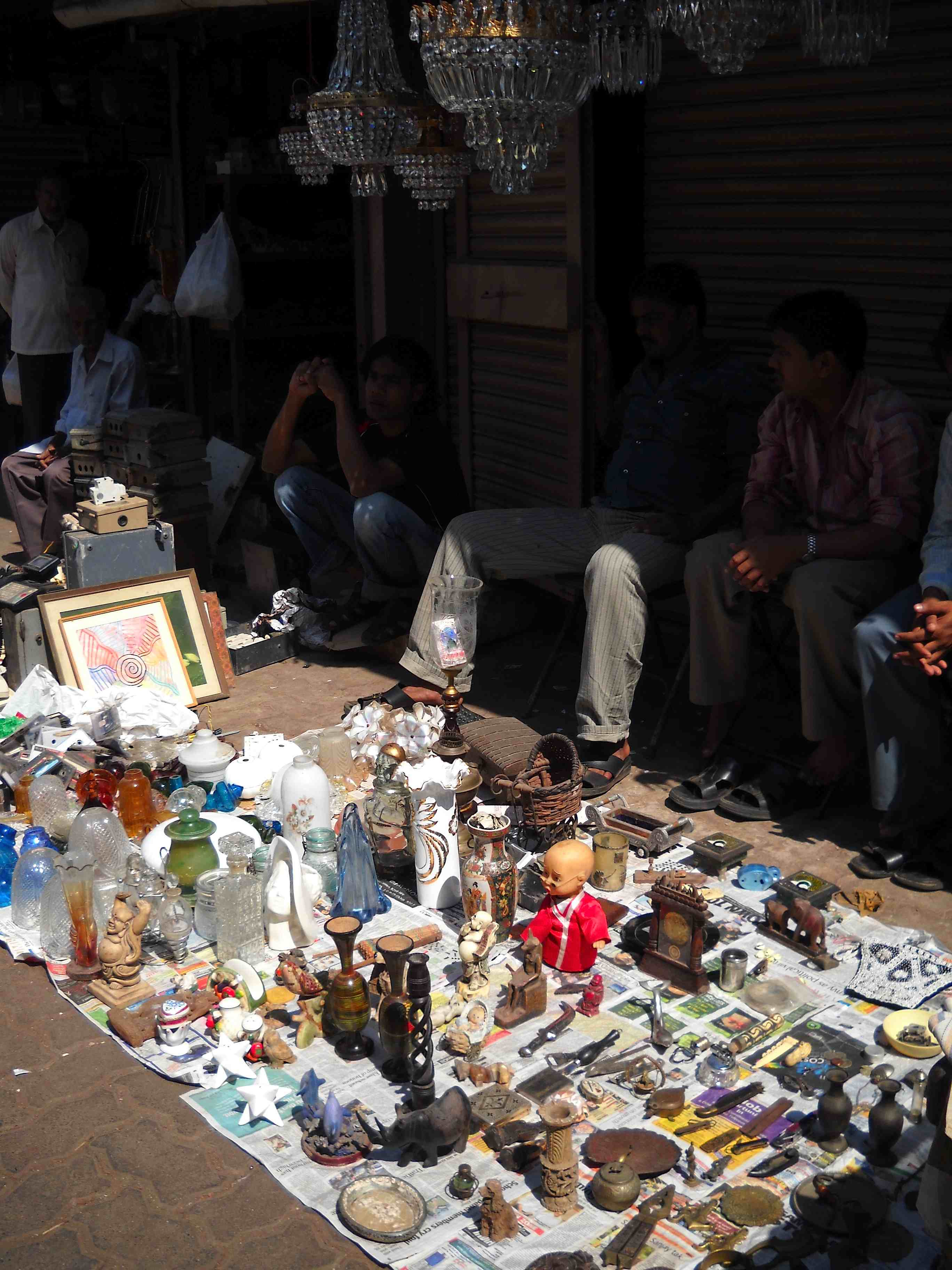
The Chor Bazaar in Mumbai, India

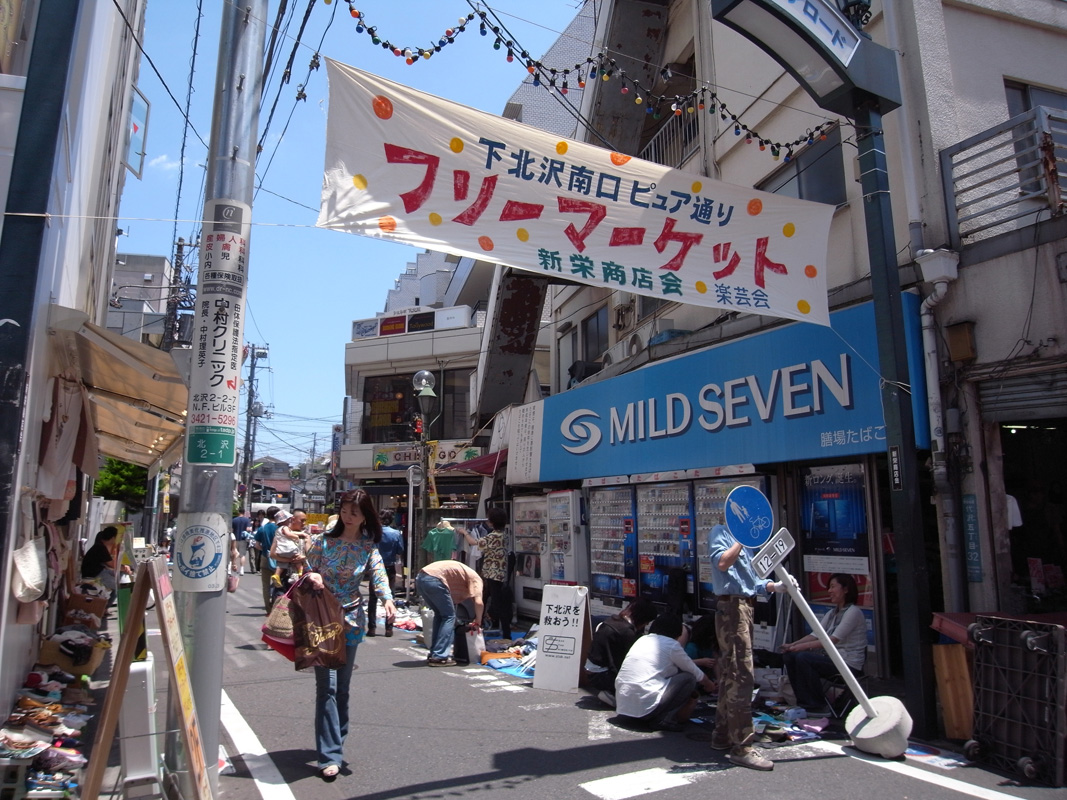
In Shimokitazawa, Japan

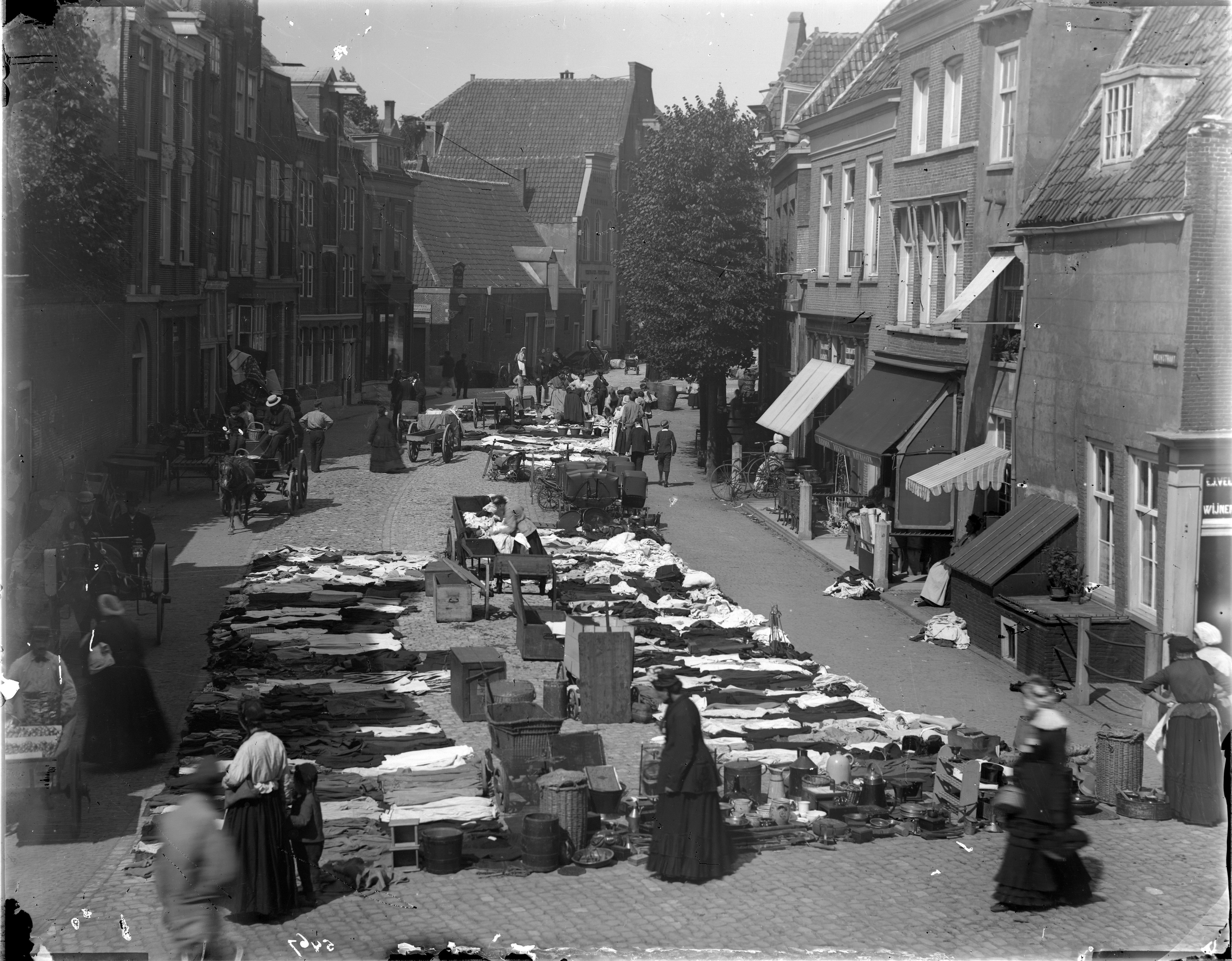
Flea market (Leiden, end of the 19th century)

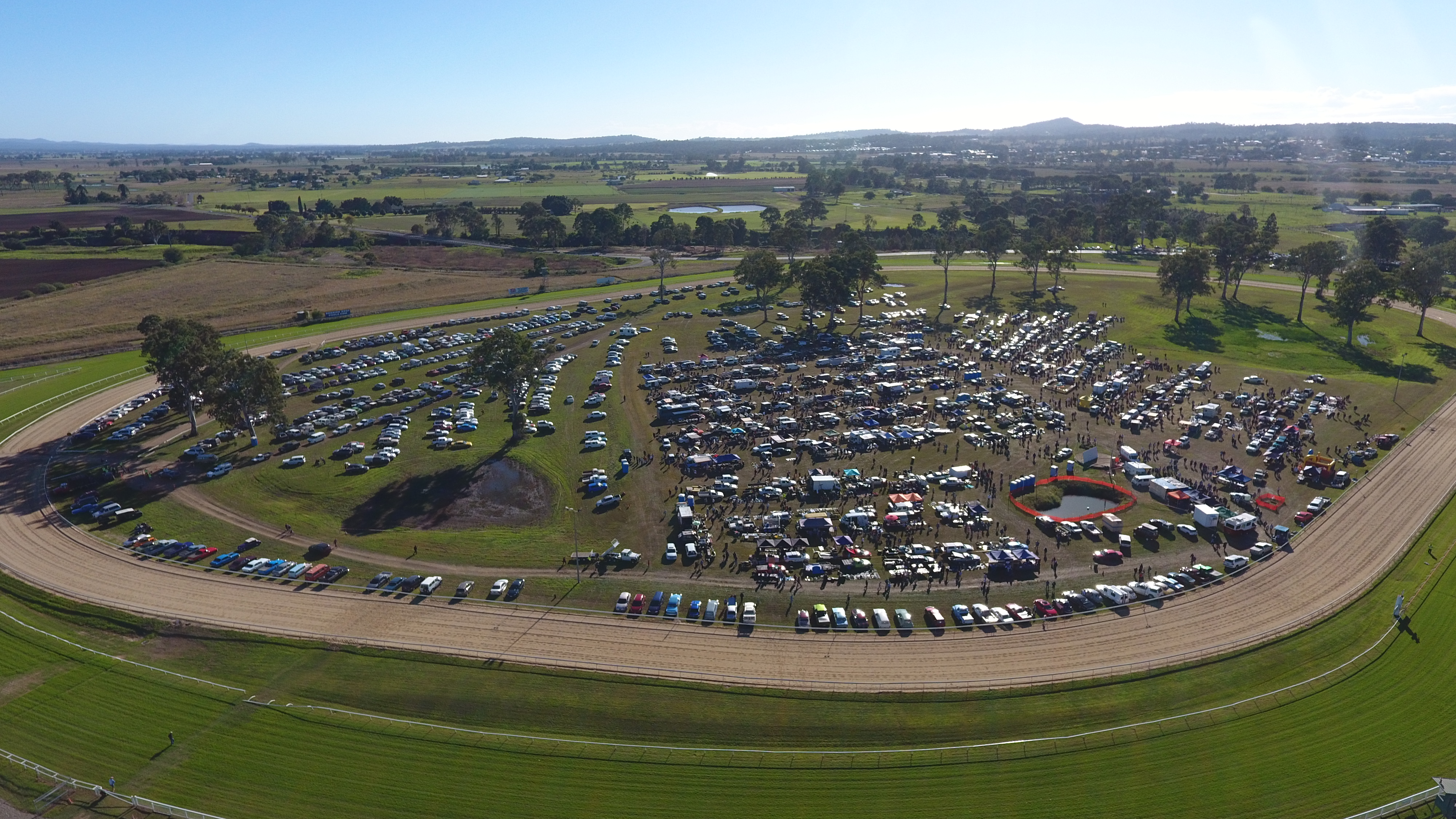
A large swap meet held in Beaudesert, Queensland, Australia

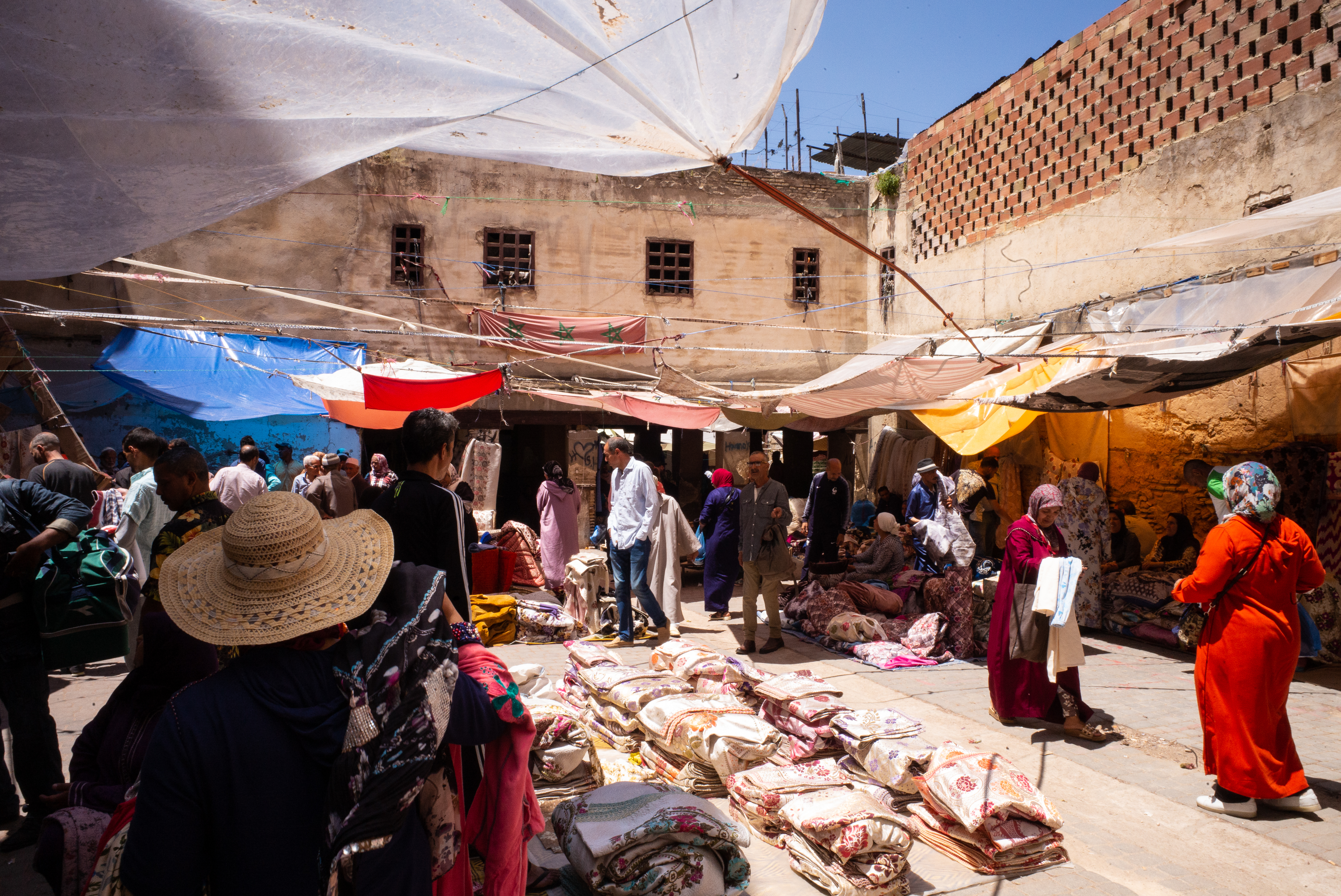
"juṭiyya" (flea market) in Fez, Morocco

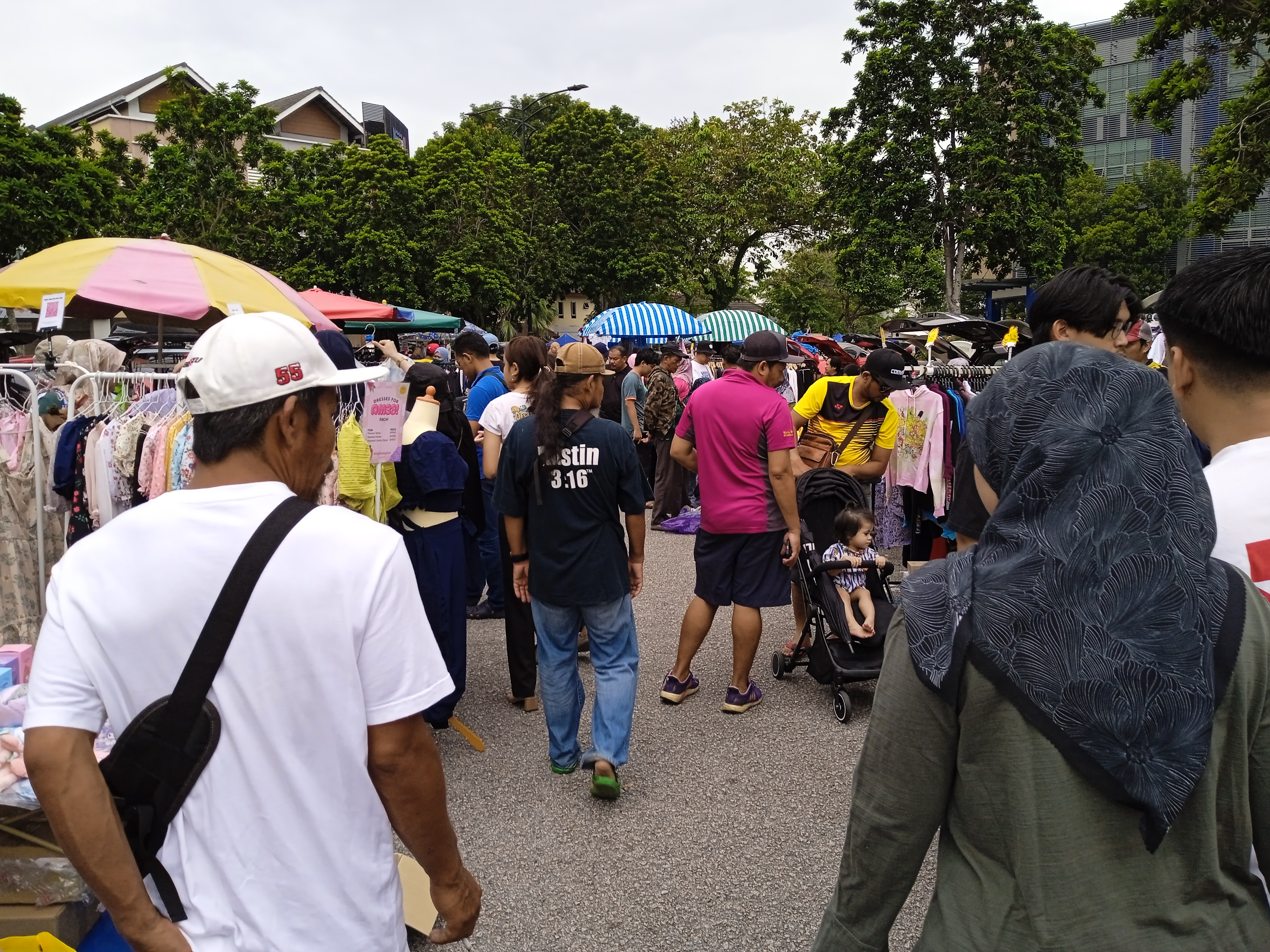
Flea market in Malaysia

== See also ==
- Agora
- Braderie
- Car boot sale
- Charity shop
- Discount store
- Farmers' market
- Garage sale
- Hamfest
- Jumble sale
- Pasar malam
- Ukay-ukay
- White elephant sale
