= Canadian Passenger Association =

Canadian Passenger Association (French: Conseil canadien des services voyageurs) was an association of railway companies serving Canada that authorized and administered discount rail fares for travel to conventions or special events or to certain categories of travellers, such as commercial travellers, clergy, or charitable workers. The association's functions "relate[d] mainly to tariffs and ticket regulations."

Similar associations operated in the United States prior to the creation of Amtrak.
