= Christine Tacon =

British ombudswoman

Christine Mary Tacon CBE (born 29 October 1959) is a British government administrator. Tacon was the United Kingdom's first Groceries Code Adjudicator.

== Early life ==
Tacon was born in the Hartismere Rural District in Suffolk, England. Tacon attended the all-female independent Wycombe Abbey in High Wycombe. Tacon grew up in Norfolk.

She read Production Engineering at Girton College, Cambridge.

== Career ==
In 1982, Tacon started at Coats Viyella, working at Dynacast in France and Germany. From 2000 to 2012, Tacon was managing director of Co-operative Farms.

In 2010, the position of Groceries Code Adjudicator (GCA) was created in U.K. and she was appointed to this position. She oversees the Groceries Supply Code of Practice. In 2017, Christine was reappointed as U.K.'s GCA.

She is one of several Ambassador for the March 2019 International Food and Drink event in London, England.

== Personal life ==
Tacon speaks German and French. She is a Chartered Engineer. She lives in Sutton Lane Ends, Macclesfield. She married in October 1992 in Norwich. She now has two children, a daughter born in November 1995 and a son born in July 1998.

In the 2004 Birthday Honours, Tacon was appointed a CBE.
