= Scottsdale Galleria (Arizona) =

Former shopping mall in Scottsdale, Arizona

- Location: Scottsdale, Arizona, United States
- Coordinates: 33°29′55.61″N 111°55′31.94″W
- Address: 4343 N. Scottsdale Road
- Opened: May 23, 1991 (phased opening)
- Closed: 1993
- Architect: D.I. Design of Baltimore
- Num. of stores: 245 (planned)
- Floors: 4

The Scottsdale Galleria was an enclosed shopping mall in downtown Scottsdale, Arizona, United States. It began a phased opening on May 23, 1991, and held its grand opening on November 16 of that year. The Galleria ceased operating as a shopping mall in 1993, although a small number of businesses remained in the complex into 1994. The former mall was subsequently renovated and converted into an office complex known as the Galleria Corporate Centre.

== History ==
The Scottsdale Galleria Limited Partnership was formed in 1984. The partnership began assembling property for the proposed development the following year. Melvin Simon and Associates joined the project in September 1988.

Construction began on July 19, 1989, following delays in obtaining financing. The mall began opening in phases on May 23, 1991. Its interior consisted of four levels around a large central space and included glass elevators, skylights, marble flooring and a computer-controlled fountain. The architects were D.I. Design of Baltimore. The Galleria held its grand opening on November 16, 1991.

The development encountered financial problems shortly after opening. The property entered foreclosure in July 1993 after the partnership defaulted on its loan and was auctioned in October 1993. The Morrison Institute for Public Policy at Arizona State University identifies 1993 as the year in which the Galleria shut down.

Some businesses continued operating after the mall's shutdown. The final store in the atrium closed in February 1994, while the Scottsdale Galleria Cineplex closed on April 14, 1994.

In 1997, the former mall hosted Icons, a traveling exhibition of artifacts from the National Archives curated by the Smithsonian Institution. The six-week exhibition attracted approximately 160,000 visitors.

By 1998, the former mall was largely vacant and was the subject of redevelopment proposals.

In 1999, plans for the Canals of Scottsdale redevelopment project called for the former Galleria to be converted into a museum complex.

The proposal was ultimately abandoned.

== Conversion to offices ==
The property came under new ownership in 2000 and was converted from a shopping mall into an office development. The property was renovated in 2001 and divided into two designated buildings, with office space as well as some mixed office and retail use.

By 2003, the Morrison Institute reported that the former Galleria had been renovated to accommodate technology and telecommunications businesses. The property continues to operate as the Galleria Corporate Centre.

== Current use ==
The former mall now operates as The Galleria, an office complex consisting of two buildings at 4301 and 4343 North Scottsdale Road. The buildings are connected by a skybridge and comprise approximately 600,000 sq ft (56,000 m^{2}) of office space.

In 2013, JEMB Realty sold the property to a joint venture of Stockdale Capital Partners and funds managed by Oaktree Capital Management. At the time of the sale, the complex was nearly 90 percent leased.

In 2026, PURE Insurance signed a lease for 40,300 sq ft (3,740 m^{2}) for its regional headquarters at the complex. Other tenants included Indeed and AmTrust Financial.
