= Tokio Millennium Re =

Reinsurance company

Coordinates: 32°17′24.50″N 64°47′25.19″W

Tokio Millennium Re Ltd.
- Type: Subsidiary
- Industry: Reinsurance
- Founded: 2000
- Headquarters: Hamilton, Bermuda
- Key people: Stephan Ruoff (CEO); Kiichiro Hatakeyama (COO)
- Revenue: US$ 395 million (2010)
- Net income: US$65 million (2010)
- Total assets: US$1,641 million (2010)
- Total equity: US$1,188 million (2010)
- Parent: Tokio Marine & Nichido Fire Insurance Co., Ltd.
- Website: www.tokiomillennium.com

Tokio Millennium Re Ltd. (abbreviated as TMR) is a reinsurance company headquartered in Hamilton, Bermuda with branches in Stamford, Connecticut, USA, Zurich, Switzerland and Sydney, Australia. The lines of business written include property catastrophe, workers compensation and terrorism.

TMR was established in Bermuda in 2000 as a subsidiary of Tokio Marine & Nichido Fire Insurance Co., Ltd. and is licensed as a class 3B insurance company in Bermuda.

TMR is currently rated AA− (Very Strong) by Standard & Poor's and A++ (Superior) by A. M. Best.

== Company history ==
First announcements about the establishment of TMR with an initial capital of US$125 million in Bermuda were made in 2000. TMR was expected to start its operation beginning of April 2000 with Shin-ichiro Okada named as CEO. The parent company initially announced that TMR's primary mission was not to earn a profit through assumed reinsurance but to use reinsurance as a tool to make effective use of its capital.

Effective August 1, 2006 Tatsuhiko Hoshina became CEO and president of TMR.

The Zurich branch of TMR was registered in August 2010. Stephan Ruoff was appointed CEO of the branch in May 2011.

TMR announced the opening of an Australian branch in March 2011 after having received authorisation by the Australian Prudential Regulation Authority. The branch was capitalised with A$80 million of assets in Australia. The expectation for this undertaking was to identify property and casualty treaty opportunities emanating from Australia and New Zealand. Russell Brooke was appointed managing director of the branch.

TMR was acquired by RenaissanceRe in 2018 for $1.5 billion.

== Rating history ==
=== Standard & Poor's ===
In June 2000 TMR received a AAA rating from Standard & Poor's. The outlook on the rating was negative, due to the expectation that TMR's rating would follow that of its mother company, Tokio Marine & Nichido Fire Insurance Co., Ltd.

In February 2001, this rating was revised to AA+ with outlook negative. Standard & Poor's stated that aside from the then recent lowering of Japan's sovereign rating, the rating was reflective of Tokio Marine & Nichido Fire Insurance Co., Ltd. modest underwriting performance as well as the unfavorable situation of the Japanese non-life insurance industry.

In September 2004, Standard & Poor's affirmed TMR's AA− rating and upgraded the outlook from negative to stable. Because Standard & Poor's criteria require ratings of strategically important subsidiaries to be at least one notch below the rating assigned to the parent company, Tokio Marine & Nichido Fire Insurance Co., Ltd. issued a guarantee. This allowed TMR to carry the same rating as its parent company. For the same reason, the outlook was adjusted to the outlook of the parent company.

In May 2007 Standard & Poor's revised its position and raised the financial strength rating from AA− to AA. Standard & Poor's expected TMR to maintain strong credit quality due to its very strong financial profile.

In January 2011 TMR was downgraded from AA to AA− due to the lowered sovereign rating of Japan.

=== A. M. Best ===
In June 2003 A. M. Best announced that it had affirmed the financial strength rating of A++ to TMR together with a negative rating outlook.

In July 2005 TMR's rating was yesterday downgraded from A++ to A+ by A.M. Best. The outlook however was revised to stable from negative. The downgrade was triggered by a new insurance group methodology of A.M. Best.

In November 2009 A.M. Best affirmed the financial strength rating of A+ with stable outlooks. The strategic importance of TMR to Tokio Marine Group's overseas expansion initiative was pointed out. It was further stated that TMR benefited from the global recognition and balance sheet strength of its parent. The rating was assumed to reflect TMR's excellent financial strength, favorable operating performance over the last several years and its prudent risk management practices.

In November 2011 TMR was upgraded from A+ to A++ by A. M. Best. The decision of A. M. Best was based on TMR's expansion into standard lines of reinsurance, conservative investment portfolio, and strong capitalization, thanks to it being a wholly owned subsidiary of Tokio Marine & Nichido Fire Insurance Co., Ltd.

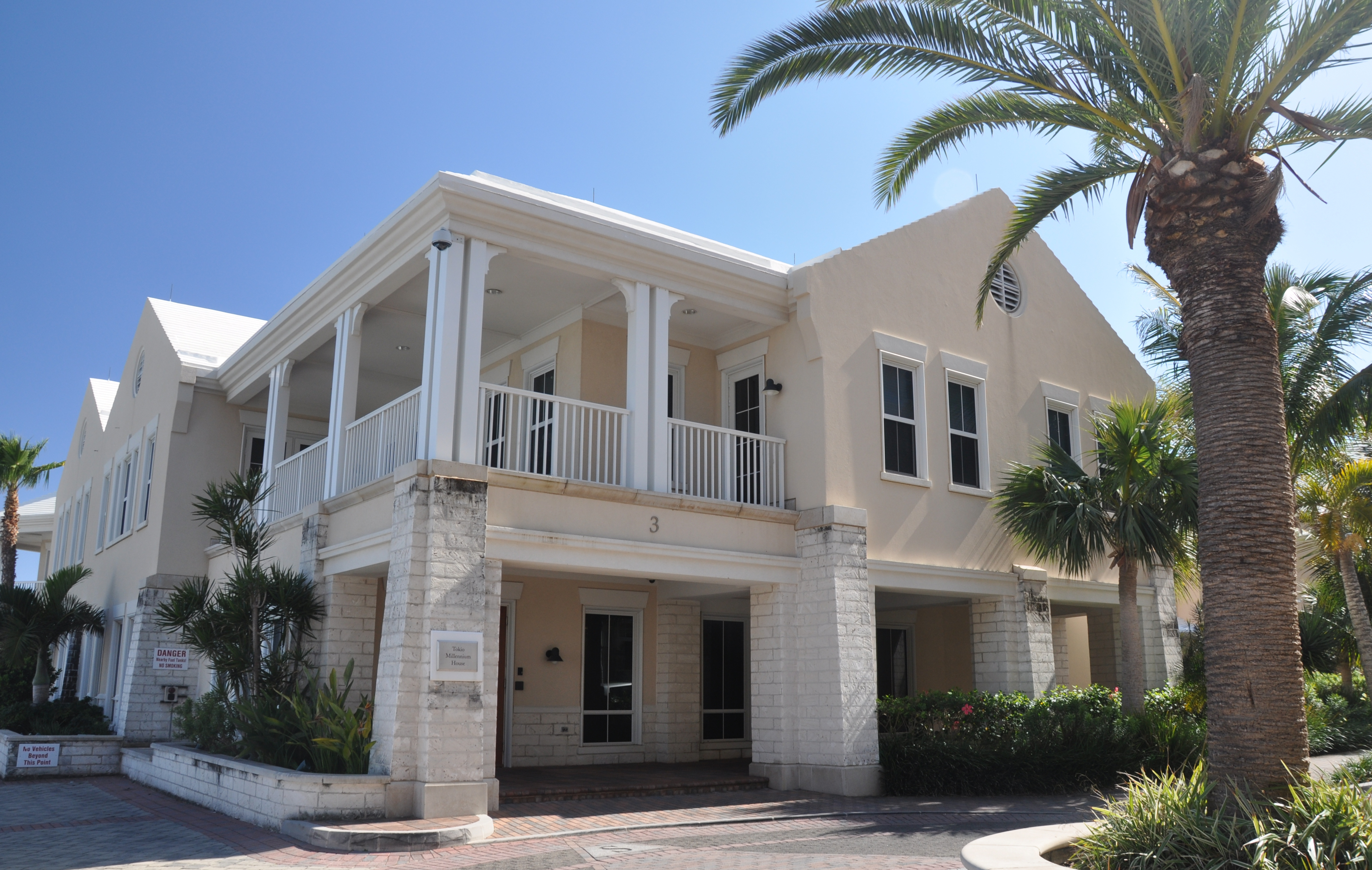
Tokio Millennium House Bermuda

== Key figures ==
	2010	2009	2008	2007	2006	2005	2004	2003
Gross Written Premium ($M)	509.2	417.6	369.8	297	275.6	129.8	102.4	103.8
Investment Income ($M)	38.6	28.8	36.2	43.1	36.9	23.6	20.4	17.5
Net Income ($M)	65.0	200.5	126.6	167.7	123.9	130.5	26.2	53.8

== Awards ==
In 2011 TMR was elected one of the "Top 10 Employers That Stand Out in Bermuda" by the Bottom Line magazine. During the award ceremony, the Bermudian Minister of Economy, Trade & Industry Kim Wilson addressed the winners: "You have persevered despite the tough economic climate to not only ensure your businesses have thrived, but you have worked very hard to make your employees feel valued, by offering superior benefits and training, by encouraging a positive workplace environment, by contributing to the community and by employing people who are committed to their roles and to fulfilling your mission and mandate".

In 2011 TMR won the Market Facilitator of the year award by the Trading Risk magazine. Trading Risk stated that "TMR serves a crucial segment of the insurance-linked capital markets and acted as risk transformer on 247 deals in 2010 – representing more than $800mn of limit and almost $150mn in premium".

== Corporate social responsibility ==
TMR is registered as a donor with The Centre On Philanthropy in Bermuda. The funding focus lies on youth development programs, children & youth services and recreation & sports.

In the fiscal year 2010/2011 TMR was a Venturer Supporter of Raleigh International Bermuda, a branch of Raleigh International.

The Tokio Millennium Re Triathlon 2011 took place in May. More than 100 participants in various events crossed the finish line.

In October 2011 a team of TMR employees participated and won first place in the Give Back Games, leading to a donation of US$11,000 for the Bermudian charity WindReach.

In April 2012 the Bermuda Cricket Board announced that TMR would sponsor 8&Under League for the 2012 season.

In June and July 2012 TMR will support Bermuda Glee, a ten-day intensive in the performing arts for Bermudian students aged 14 to 19. The 2012 program aims to get 75 young people from different schools around the Island to develop their talents in the performing arts.

The Tokio Millennium Re Triathlon 2012 took place in June. Tyler Butterfield won the men's title in sprint distance triathlon, Kristyn Robinson the women's.
