= Anicom =

Pet insurance company

Anicom Holdings, Inc.
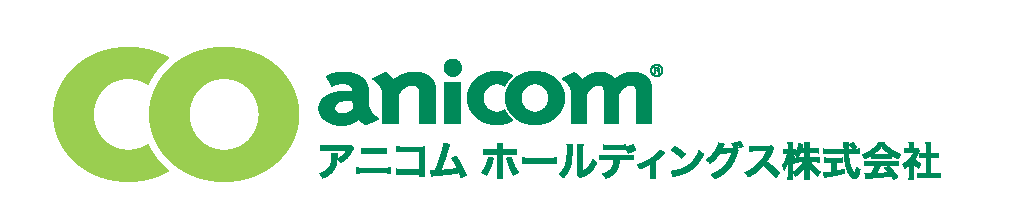
- Type: Public KK (TYO: 8715)
- Industry: Insurance
- Founded: July 5, 2000
- Headquarters: Shinjuku, Tokyo, Japan
- Area served: Japan
- Key people: Nobuaki Komori (President & CEO)
- Revenue: ▲JPY 334,623 million (FY2009)
- Net income: ▲JPY 107,099 million (FY2009)
- Number of employees: 287 (2010)
- Website: http://www.anicom-sompo.co.jp/

Anicom Holdings, Inc. (アニコムホールディングス株式会社, Kabushiki-Kaisha) is a pet insurance company based in Tokyo, Japan with its headquarters in Shinjuku.

== History ==
The company was founded in 2000 by Nobuaki Komori, formerly of Tokio Marine. As of December 2007, Anicom's total number of subscribers exceeded 294,000. The company works with over 4,000 animal hospitals and clinics and has paid out more than one million benefit payments.

== Listing on stock exchange ==
Anicom had been managed as a mutual aid enterprise by members of Anicom Club. Anicom made their request to the Financial Services Agency of Japan and at the same time increased the capital stock amount. On December 26, 2007, the subsidiary company, Anicom Property and Casualty Insurance Corporation, acquired their property and casualty insurance license from the Financial Services Agency of Japan becoming the first pet insurance specialist company in Japan.

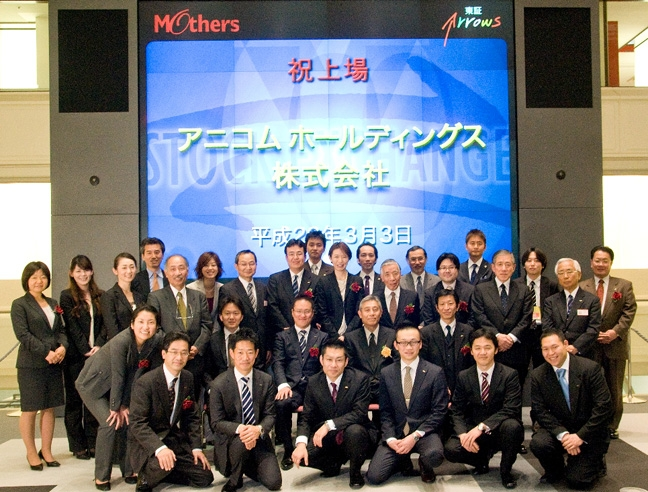
Anicom's key members at Tokyo Stock Exchange. March 3rd, 2010.

Anicom Holdings, Inc. was listed on the Tokyo Stock Exchange (Mothers listing) on March 3, 2010.

== Related business ==
Anicom holds animal welfare and protection awareness programs. Anicom sponsors pet related publications and magazines and helps manage website information with animal hospitals throughout Japan.
