= HCCH (disambiguation) =

HCCH is the chemical formula for acetylene.

HCCH may also refer to:

- HCC Insurance Holdings, an insurance company
- Hague Conference on Private International Law
