= Supplier evaluation =

Supplier evaluation and supplier appraisal are terms used in business and refer to the processes of evaluating and approving potential suppliers by quantitative assessment. The aim of the process is to ensure a portfolio of best-in-class suppliers is available for use. Supplier evaluation can also be applied to current suppliers in order to measure and monitor their performance for the purposes of ensuring contract compliance, reducing costs, mitigating risk and driving continuous improvement.

== Process ==
Supplier evaluation is a continual process within purchasing departments, and forms part of the pre-qualification step within the purchasing process, although in many organizations, it includes the participation and input of other departments and stakeholders. Most experts or firms experienced in collecting supplier evaluation information prefer doing so using five-step processes for determining which to approve. Their processes often take the form of either a questionnaire or interview, sometimes even a site visit, and includes appraisals of various aspects of the supplier's business including capacity, financials, quality assurance, organizational structure and processes and performance. Performance generally includes quality and delivery: research by Valerie Stueland published in 2004 found that in her study of supplier evaluation, every example she reviewed used both quality and delivery as evaluation factors. Based on the information obtained via the evaluation, a supplier is scored and either approved or not approved as one from whom to procure materials or services. In many organizations, there is an "approved supplier list" (ASL) to which a qualified supplier is then added. If rejected, the supplier is generally not made available to the assessing company's procurement team. Once approved, a supplier may be reevaluated on a periodic, often annual, basis. The ongoing process is defined as supplier performance management.

== Benefits and drawbacks ==
There are various benefits associated with an effective supplier evaluation process such as mitigation against poor supplier performance or performance failures, especially to avoid appointing a supplier and subsequently finding out that their performance is unsatisfactory. The benefits typically include sourcing from suppliers that provide high standards of product and service levels whilst offering sufficient capacity and business stability. Supplier evaluation can help customers and suppliers identify and remove hidden cost drivers in the supply chain. The process of evaluating performance can motivate suppliers to improve their performance.

Whilst a supplier appraisal system might be considered "good in theory", there are costs associated with the time and resources needed for implementation and operation. Each organisation needs to assess whether an appraisal system offers value for money and make an informed decision about the extent to which it is applied to suppliers. To mitigate costs, large corporations often have a dedicated procurement department which performs cost-benefit analysis to evaluate if the company should engage the vendor or perform the task in-house. Such a department can take a considerable amount of resources, thus management's commitment and support of a supplier evaluation process is essential.

== Tools ==
Some of the challenges associated with supplier evaluation may be mitigated by the use of appropriate tools. For simple projects a spreadsheet can be used. But as evaluations become more complex or more frequent data management and data integrity issues become significant. Web Electronic RFP / Tendering systems are often used for initial selection projects. Some products provide functionality for combining both initial selection and ongoing evaluation and benchmarking.

Within established procurement teaching, the Carter 10Cs model is one model in use. This model looks at ten aspects which can be evaluated before contracting with a business, to reduce the risks associated with supplier selection and as part of ongoing supplier performance appraisal. The ten Cs listed by Ray Carter are:

- Capacity (does the organization have the capacity to deliver the order?)
- Competency (are the organization, its people and its process competent?)
- Consistency
- Control of process (can the organization control its process and offer flexibility?)
- Commitment to Quality (does the organization effectively monitor and manage quality?)
- Cash (does the organization have a strong enough financial base?)
- Cost (is the product or service offered at a competitive price?)
- Culture (are the supplier and buyer cultures compatible?)
- Clean (is the organization ethical, funded legitimately, does not engage child labor, etc.?)
- Communication efficiency (does the organization have support technology of information integration to support collaboration and co-ordination in the supply chain?).

== Financial Services ==
In the UK financial services sector, the Financial Services Supplier Qualification System (FSQS) is a collaborative due diligence system currently used for supplier evaluation by 29 major UK banks, building societies and insurance companies: Aldermore Bank, Allied Irish Bank, Arbuthnot Latham, Bank of England, Bank of Ireland, BNP Paribas Clydesdale Bank (including Virgin Money), Hastings Group, Lloyds Banking Group, LV=, Masthaven Bank, Metro Bank, Nationwide Building Society, NFU Mutual PCF Bank Royal and Sun Alliance, Rugby and Hinckley Building Society, Santander, Shawbrook Bank, Tokio Marine Kiln, TSB and Weatherbys Bank. The system is operated by Oxford-based company Hellios Information Ltd.
