= International Property Exchange =

International Property Exchange refers to the global real estate transactions among vendors, sales agencies, sales professionals and consumers around the world.
