= The Market NYC =

Flea market in New York City

Coordinates: 40°43′43.3″N 73°59′59.5″W

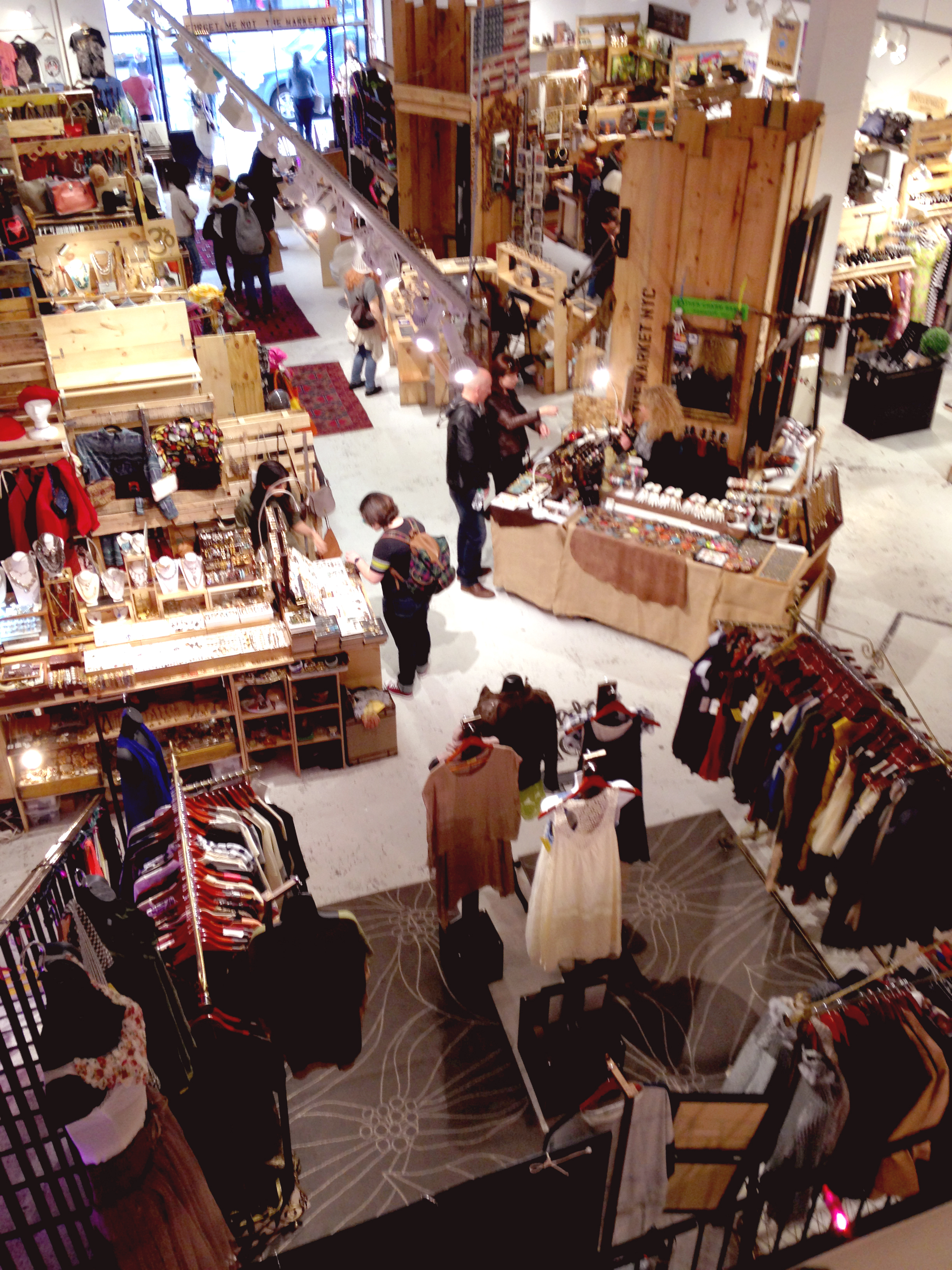
The Bleecker Street location of The Market NYC, an indoor flea market in New York City

The Market NYC is a designer and vintage goods flea market with outlets in several locations in New York City. The market has two locations: one at 290 Mulberry Street in Nolita, Manhattan and another at 218 Bedford Avenue in the Williamsburg neighborhood of Brooklyn.

== History ==
The Market NYC was founded in 2002, when a small group of designers and artists, including the Alex Pabon and Nicolas Petrou, were looking for a location in New York City to sell their goods, rather than do so on a consignment basis in boutiques, or on open day at Henri Bendel – where lines of designers waited outside for hours to have a chance to sell. They came up with the idea for a market where young and upcoming designers could sell their creations with the least financial risk, could test the market, and learn the business without having to commit to a long-term lease. The ability to get feedback from their clientele was another important consideration.

In 2012, The Market NYC moved from its original Nolita location to a new location at 159 Bleecker Street, next to the rock club The Bitter End. The new location, a historic building dating from 1917, once housed the Circle in the Square Theatre. In 2015, The Market NYC opened a Brooklyn branch in Williamsburg at 218 Bedford Avenue. In 2016, The Market NYC opened another new location in Nolita at 290 Mulberry Street.
