= Tokio Marine Nichido =

Japanese insurance company

Tokio Marine & Nichido Fire Insurance Co., Ltd.
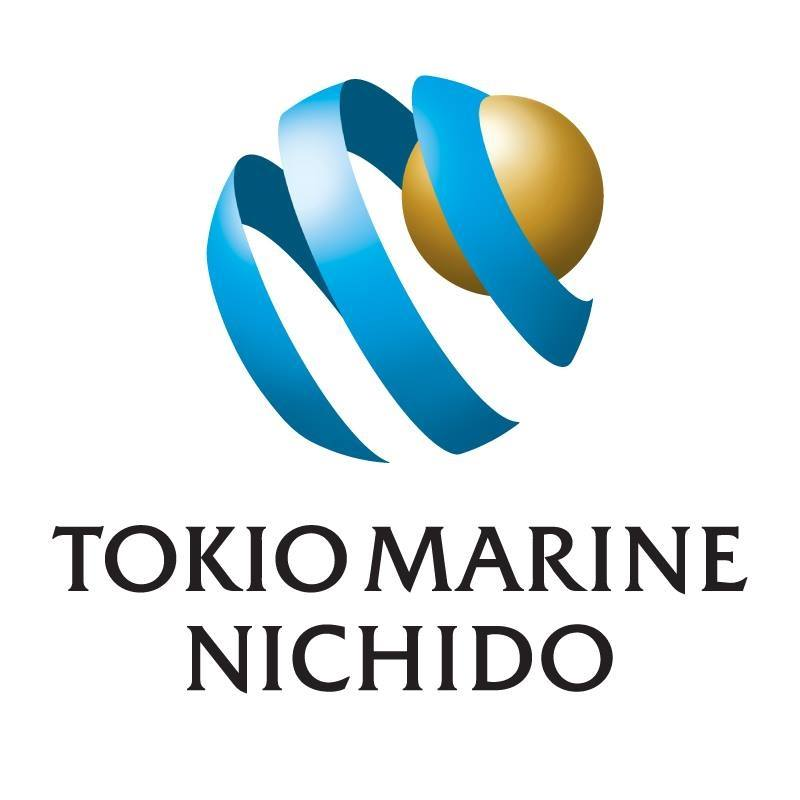

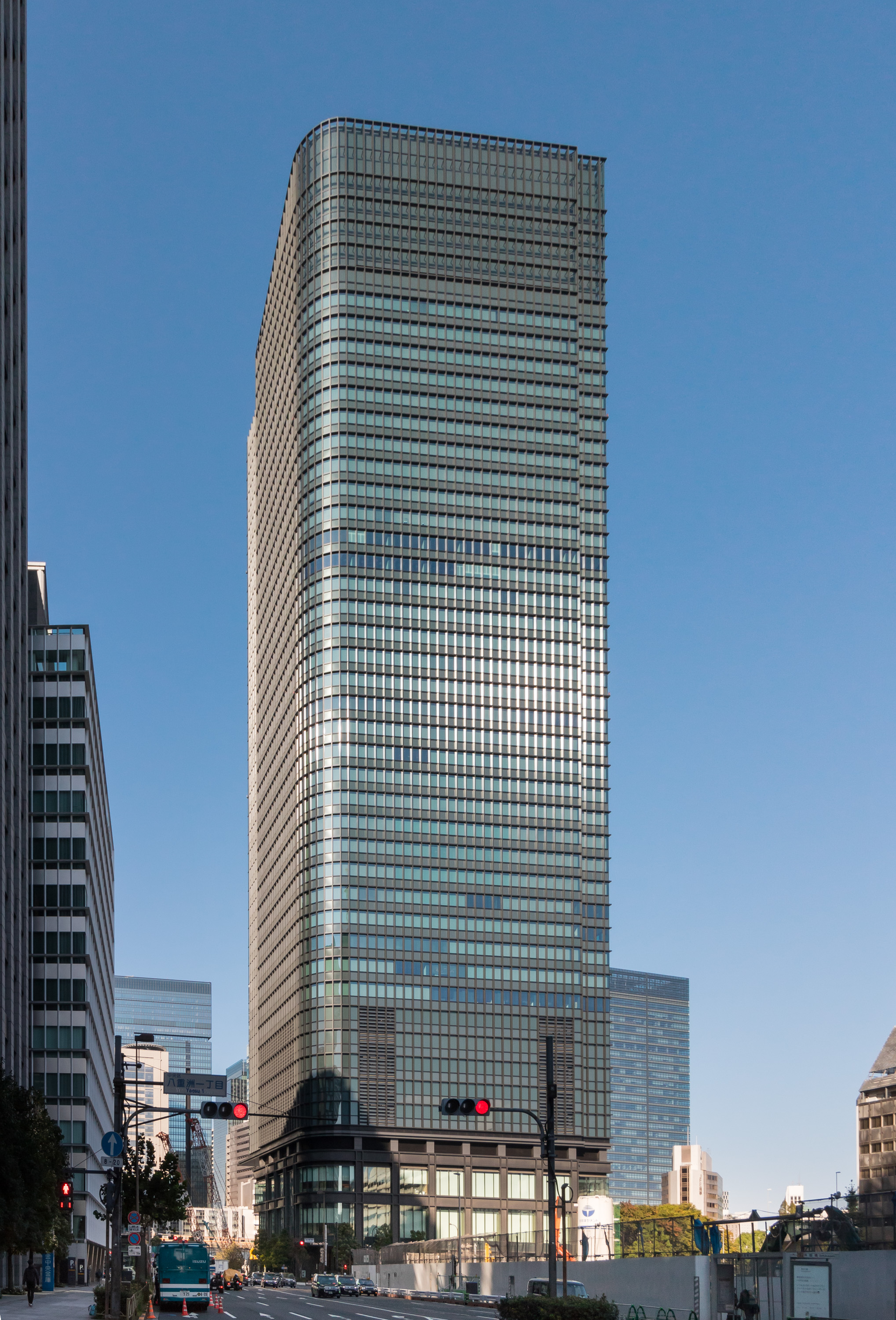
- Native name: 東京海上日動火災保険株式会社
- Romanized name: Tōkyō Kaijō Nichidō Kasai Hoken
- Formerly: Tokio Marine Insurance Company (1879-1944); Tokio Marine & Fire Insurance Co., Ltd. (1944-2004)
- Company type: Subsidiary
- Industry: Insurance
- Founded: August 1879; 146 years ago
- Headquarters: Ōtemachi, Chiyoda, Tokyo, Japan
- Parent: Tokio Marine Holdings
- Website: www.tokiomarine-nichido.co.jp

Tokio Marine & Nichido Fire Insurance Co., Ltd. (東京海上日動火災保険株式会社, Tōkyō Kaijō Nichidō Kasai Hoken Kabushiki-Kaisha), commonly called Tokio Marine Nichido, is a property/casualty insurance subsidiary of Tokio Marine Holdings, the largest non-mutual private insurance group in Japan. Tokio Marine Holdings was formerly known as Millea Group, which underwent a name change in July 2008. Its headquarters are in Marunouchi, Chiyoda, Tokyo.

The company is one of the very few groups and individuals that still use the spelling Tokio for the city in the English language.

== History ==
=== The Tokio Marine and Fire Insurance ===
The antecedent Tokyo Marine insurance is the first insurance company (as the marine insurance company) in Japan, and also the top sales damage insurance company of Japan in pre-war era.

- August 1879 - Tokyo Marine Insurance (東京海上保険) established.
- January 1891 - Meiji Fire Insurance (明治火災保険) established.
- April 1918 - Tokyo Marine Insurance changes the trade name to Tokyo Marine and Fire Insurance (東京海上火災保険).
- March 1919 - Mitsubishi Marine and Fire Insurance (三菱海上火災保険) established.
- March 1944 - Tokio Marine and Fire Insurance acquires Meiji Fire Insurance and the Mitsubishi Marine and Fire insurance.

=== The Nichido Fire & Marine Insurance ===
The company was one of the "Big Three Personal property insurance companies" in pre-war Japan. It belonged to the old Yasuda zaibatsu.

- February 1898 - Tokyo Article Fire Insurance (東京物品火災保険) established.
- November 1911 - Toho Fire Insurance (東邦火災保険) established.
- January 1914 - Tokyo Article Fire Insurance change the trade name to the Japan Personal Property fire insurance (日本動産火災保険).
- August 1944 - Japan Personal Property fire insurance acquires Toho Fire Insurance.
- December 1946 - Change of trade name to Nichido Fire & Marine Insurance.

=== Mergers ===
In April 2002, Tokio Marine & Fire Insurance Co. and Nichido Fire & Marine Insurance Co. integrated their operations, creating a new holding company, Millea Insurance Group. Tokio Marine, then Japan's largest nonlife insurer, and Nichido Fire became Millea Insurance Group's wholly owned subsidiaries. On 1 November 2004, Tokio Marine & Fire Insurance and Nichido Fire and Marine Insurance merged to create Tokio Marine & Nichido Fire Insurance Co., Ltd.

=== 2008 fraud scandal ===
In 2008 the president of the company resigned. It was found that the company had fraudulently failed to pay out insurance claims in over 1000 cases. They had also neglected to pay benefits on another 85,000 insurance products and overcharged policyholders on premiums, causing a major scandal involving over 7 billion yen ($86,000,000 in today's money) and leading to penalties for over 170 executives.

== Subsidiaries ==
=== Japan ===
- Tokio Marine Asset Management Co.
- Tokio Marine Capital Co.
- Tokio Marine Financial Solutions
- Tokio Marine & Nichido Card Service Co.
- Tokio Marine & Nichido Medical Service Co.
- Tokio Marine Nichido Better Life Service Co.
- Tokio Marine Nichido Systems Co.
- Tokio Marine & Nichido Communications Co.
- Tokio Marine Research Institute
- International Assistance Co.
- Tokio Marine & Nichido Risk Consulting Co.
- Tokio Marine & Nichido Corporation Co.
- Japan Real Estate Asset Management Co.

=== Overseas ===
==== People's Republic of China ====
- Tokio Marine & Fire Insurance Company (Hong Kong)
- Tokio Marine Investment Services Ltd.
- Sino Life Insurance Co.

==== Singapore ====
- Tokio Marine Malayan Insurance Co., Inc.
- The Tokio Marine and Fire Insurance Company (Singapore) Pte. Limited
- TM Claims Service Asia Pte. Ltd.
- Tokio Marine Retakaful Pte. Ltd.

==== Thailand ====
- The Sri Muang Insurance Co., Ltd.
- Millea Life Insurance (Thailand) Public Co., Ltd.

==== United Kingdom ====
- Tokio Marine Kiln

==== United Arab Emirates ====
- Tokio Marine Middle East, Ltd.
- Tokio Marine & Nichido Fire Insurance Co. Ltd.

==== United States ====
- Tokio Marine HCC
- Philadelphia Insurance Companies
- Tokio Marine Management, Inc.
- Tokio Marine Technologies LLC
- Trans Pacific Insurance Company
- TM Casualty Insurance Company
- TM Specialty Insurance Company
- TNUS Insurance Company
- First Insurance Company of Hawaii, Ltd.
- TM Claims Service, Inc.
- Tokio Marine North America Services LLC.

==== Other countries ====
- Australia: Tokio Marine Management (Australasia) Pty. Ltd.
- Bahrain: The Arab Eastern Insurance Co., Ltd.
- Brazil: Tokio Marine Seguradora S.A.
- Bermuda: Tokio Millennium Re Ltd.
- Egypt: [Tokio Marine Egypt] Nile Takaful
- Guam: Tokio Marine Pacific Insurance Limited
- India: IFFCO Tokio General Insurance Company Limited
- India: Edelweiss Tokio Life Insurance Company Limited
- Indonesia: PT Asuransi Tokio Marine Indonesia
- Ireland: Tokio Marine Global Re Limited
- Vietnam: Bao Viet Tokio Marine Joint Venture Company.
- Malaysia: Tokio Marine Insurans (Malaysia) Bhd.
- México: Tokio Marine Compañía de Seguros, S.A. de C.V.
- Taiwan: Tokio Marine Newa Insurance Co., Ltd.
- Kingdom of Saudi Arabia: Alinma Tokio Marine Company
- United Arab Emirates:Tokio Marine Middleeast Limited
- United Arab Emirates:Tokio Marine Nichido Insurance UAE

== See also ==
- List of companies of Japan
