= Nicolas Petrou =

Cypriot-American fashion designer and couturier (born 1967)

- Born: Nicolas Petrou; 14 September 1967 (age 58); Nicosia, Cyprus
- Education: Central Saint Martins
- Years active: 1993–Present
- Label: Petrou\Man
- Parent(s): Spyridon Petrou and Eleftheria Efthimiou

Nicolas Petrou is a Cypriot-American fashion designer and couturier based in New York City.

== Early life and education ==
Nicolas Petrou was born in Nicosia, Cyprus to Spyridon Petrou and Eleftheria Efthimiou. After graduating from high school, he moved to London where he completed his foundations studies in art and design at Harrow College. He then attended the Regent's American College in London before enrolling in the fashion design graduate program at Central Saint Martins. He graduated from Saint Martins with a Master of Arts degree in 1992.

== Career ==
Petrou moved to New York in 1993 where he began designing for several fashion houses, receiving rave reviews for his collections. In 1995, the New York Times applauded Nicolas Petrou and his then design partner, Michael Lund as fresh, new talents. His collections have been featured in fashion and other prestigious publications, including the cover of WWD, T Magazine of The New York Times, Dazed and Confused, Seventh Man, V- MAN, Vogue, Elle, Bazaar, Numero, W, Interview, Metal and The New York Times. Additionally, Petrou has dressed many celebrities, such as Lady Gaga and Beyoncé. In 2011, Petrou was featured in the fashion book, Not A Toy: Radical Character Design in Fashion and Costume by Atopos and Vassilis Zidianakis.

=== PETROU ===
Petrou launched his private label, PETROU with a store on Madison Avenue in 2006. The store featured a high-end womenswear line.

=== PETROU\MAN ===
In 2009, he launched a high end menswear collection under the name PETROU\MAN that sells in the US and Hong Kong. The high-end menswear collection offers a "fresh twist in men's wardrobe". The debut collection, which Dazed Digital described as a deconstruction of sportswear, featured masked skins with colorful patterns, including star-spangled motifs. His second collection "was inspired by the lives of nomads and applied their travels to his signature mix of sportswear...creating a rich, unusual texture achieved through his combination of fabrics and prints". For his Spring 2011 collection, he mainly used beige and navy, mixed with tribal and ethnic prints and elaborate headpieces of colorful birds, butterflies, and tin toys. In an interview with Dazed Digital, Petrou said that the collection was a mélange of Western style with Pacific Islander and African influences.

=== audience by PETROU\MAN ===
In March 2013, Petrou launched his spinoff label, a diffusion line called audience by PETROU\MAN. The debut collection received rave reviews and one of the pieces was included in "The Top 10 Items from Fall/Winter 2014" list of The New York Times T Magazine. Inspired by abstract painting, Petrou experimented with tie-dye and acid-wash techniques on mixed textures of cotton and wool to create unique silhouettes.

== Collaborations ==
Nicolas Petrou has collaborated with various artists, such as Stephen Shanabrook and Veronika Georgieva, as well as Henrik Vibskov for the cover of Dazed & Confused, which was photographed by Kacper Kasprzyk and styled by Robbie Spencer. He also designed costumes for New York-based dance company, Chamecki Lerner. He is also one of the founders and creative director of The Market NYC.
