= PETROU\MAN =

American fashion label

- Product type: Upscale clothing
- Current owner: Nicolas Petrou
- Country: United States
- Introduced: Spring/Summer 2009; 17 years ago
- Website: Official website

PETROU\Man is an American fashion label with European aesthetics and ethnic influences. Headed by fashion designer and couturier, Nicolas Petrou, the label is sold in upscale fashion stores across the globe.

== The Label ==
Drawing on varied inspirations, including illustrations by the Japanese artists Sirichai alongside tribal and ethnic art, the upscale menswear label offers unique designs in clothing. The debut collection, which included masked skins with colorful patterns created media attention and led to a collaboration with Henrik Vibskov for the cover of Dazed & Confused. PETROU\MAN is known for combining the comfort characteristic of sportswear with elegance and timelessness characteristic of tailored high-end menswear, with a special focus on textures and color. With tribal and ethnic influences from Guatemala to West Africa, the label has been hailed "as a beacon for alternative menswear".

== Stores ==
The collection is available at stores worldwide, such OAK in New York, I.T. and Joyce in Hong Kong, and SHIPS in Japan. The collection is also available at MACHINE-A in London
