= Tokio Marine =

Japanese insurance holding company

Tokio Marine Holdings, Inc.

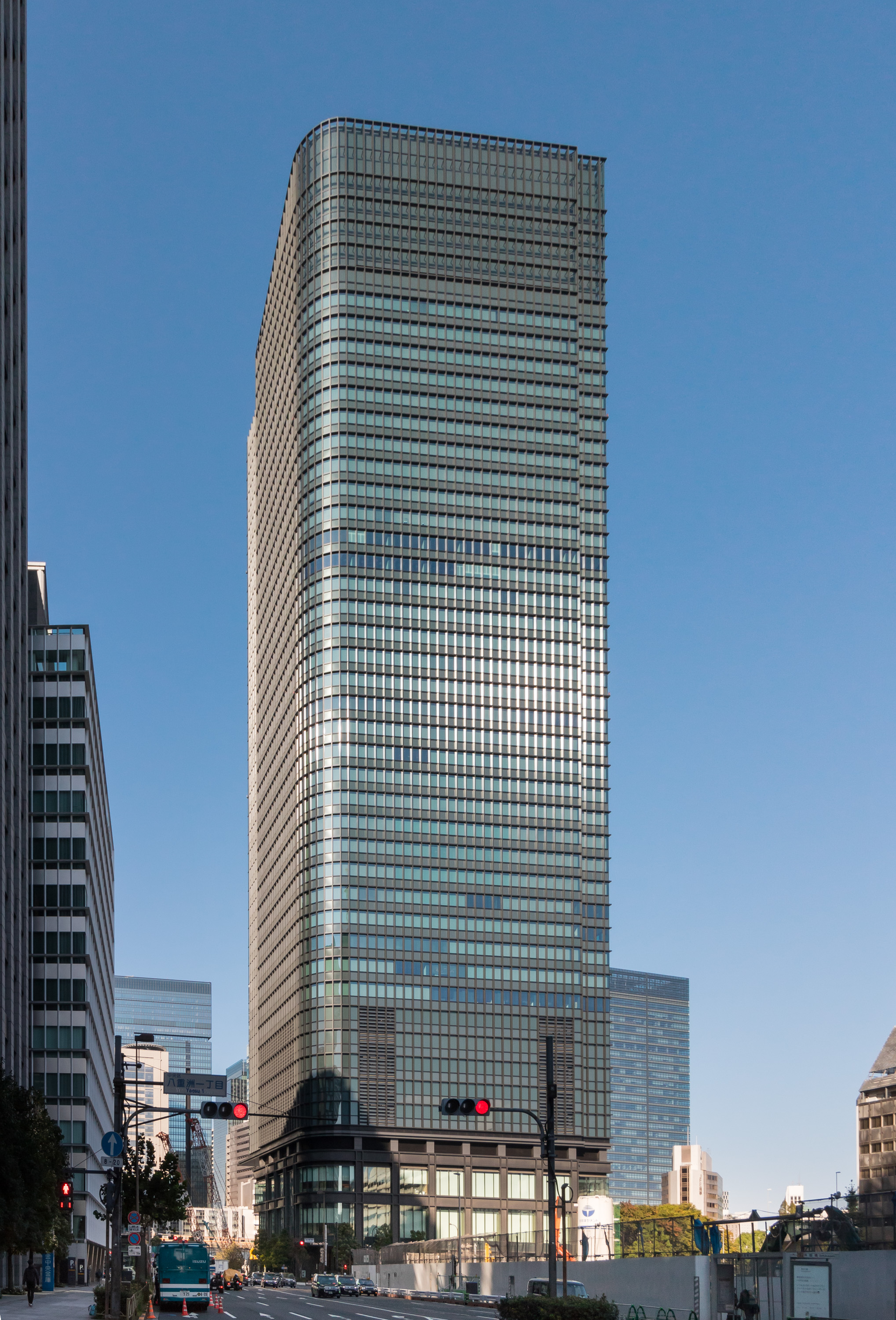
- Company headquarters in Tokiwabashi Tower, Chiyoda, Tokyo
- Native name: 東京海上ホールディングス株式会社
- Romanized name: Tōkyō Kaijō Hōrudingusu kabushiki gaisha
- Formerly: Millea Holdings, Inc. (2002–2008)
- Type: Public KK
- Traded as: TYO: 8766; Nikkei 225 component (8766); TOPIX Core30 component (8766)
- Industry: Insurance
- Founded: April 2, 2002; 24 years ago
- Headquarters: Ōtemachi, Chiyoda, Tokyo, Japan
- Area served: Worldwide
- Key people: Shuzo Sumi (Chairman of the Board); Satoru Komiya (President & Group CEO)
- Revenue: ▲JPY ¥ 5,863.7 billion (FY 2022)
- Net income: ▲JPY ¥ 420.4 billion (FY 2022)
- Number of employees: ▲43,048 (March, 2022)
- Parent: TMTBJ investment trusts (5.4%); Meiji Yasuda Life (2.1%)
- Subsidiaries: Tokio Marine Nichido
- Website: tokyomarinehd.com

Tokio Marine Holdings, Inc., is a multinational insurance holding company headquartered in Tokyo, Japan. It is the largest property/casualty insurance group in Japan in terms of revenue and is the parent company for the Tokio Marine Group which employs 39,000 people in 38 countries worldwide.

The main business of Tokio Marine is Management of non-life insurance companies, life insurance companies, specialized securities companies, foreign companies engaged in insurance businesses and any other company which is or may become a subsidiary of the Company in accordance with the provisions of the Insurance Business Law of Japan, and any other business pertaining to the foregoing item.

== History ==
Founded in 1879 as Tokio Marine Insurance, it is the oldest insurance company in Japan. Millea Holdings was established in 2002 to become the parent company to Tokio Marine Insurance and Nichido Fire Insurance in preparation for their merger, before being renamed Tokio Marine Holdings in 2008.

Tokio Marine acquired the Philadelphia Insurance Companies for $4.7 billion in 2008, and acquired the Delphi Financial Group for $2.66 billion in 2012. In June 2015, Tokio Marine announced it would be acquiring HCC Insurance Holdings for $7.5 billion. Tokio Marine forecast that 46% of its profits would come from outside Japan following the HCC acquisition.

Since June 2019, Satoru Komiya has been the President and Group CEO. In October 2019, Tokio Marine Insurance announced it would buy insurer Pure Group for about $3.1 billion.

In September 2026, Tokio Marine's subsidiary Tokio Marine & Nichido Fire Insurance settled litigation brought by Credit Suisse-linked funds in the Federal Court of Australia concerning insurance policies allegedly issued to entities associated with Greensill Capital. The settlement terms were confidential and did not constitute an admission of liability.

== Controversies ==
Insure Our Future has described Tokio Marine's environmental policy as "weak". Unlike its competitor Sompo, Tokio Marine does not plan to stop insuring coal-fired power plants in Japan.

== Holdings ==
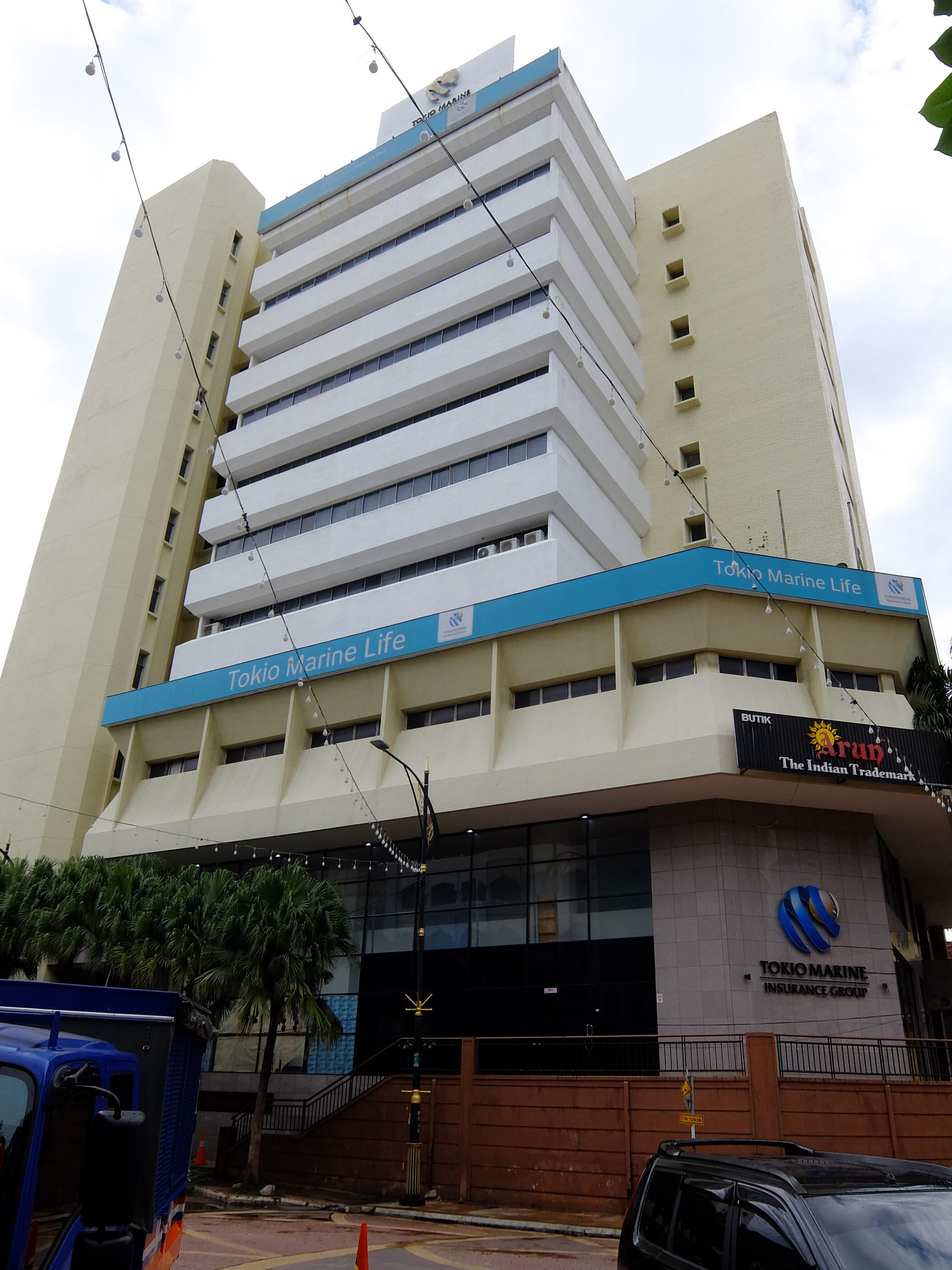
Tokio Marine Life building in Johor Bahru, Malaysia

Domestic Non-Life Insurance Business

- Tokio Marine & Nichido Fire Insurance Co.
- Nisshin Fire & Marine Co.
- E.design Insurance
- Tokio Marine Millea SAST

Domestic Life Insurance Business

- Tokio Marine & Nichido Life Insurance Co.
- Tokio Marine & Nichido Financial Life Insurance Co.

International Insurance Business

- Tokio Marine HCC
- Philadelphia Insurance Companies
- Tokio Marine Asia - Regional HQ for Asia Pacific
- First Insurance Company of Hawaii, Ltd.
- Tokio Marine Kiln Group
- Delphi Financial Group
- Tokio Marine America
- Safety National
- Reliance Standard Life Insurance Company
- Reliance Matrix

Other Non-Insurance Businesses

- Tokio Marine Asset Management
- Tokio Marine Technologies
- Tokio Marine & Nichido Career Service Co.
- Millea Real-Estate-Risk Management
- Tokio Marine & Nichido Facilities
- Millea Mondial
- Tokio Marine Nichido Samuel
