= Vendor =

Supplier of goods or services

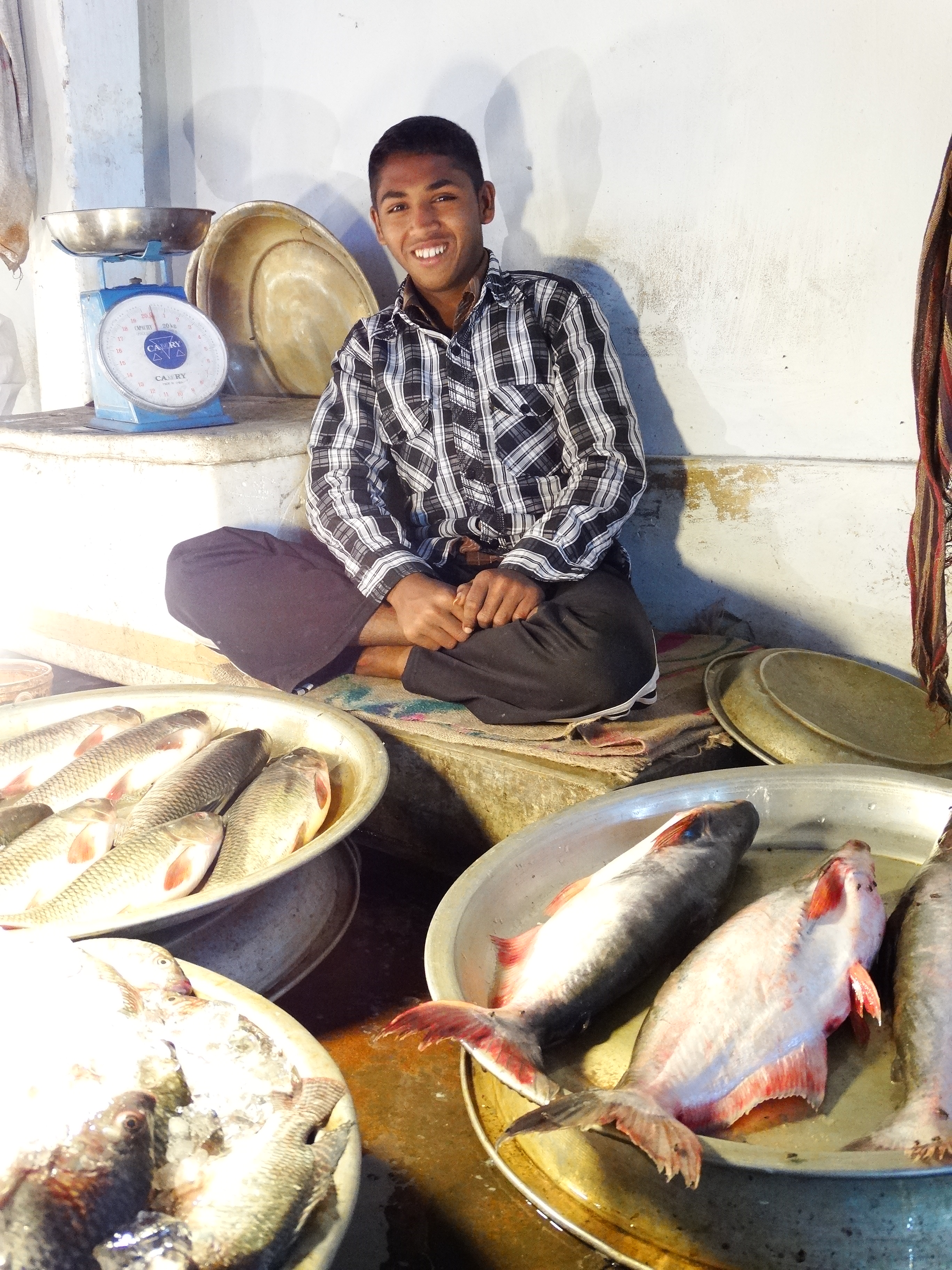
A Bengali fish vendor from Sylhet

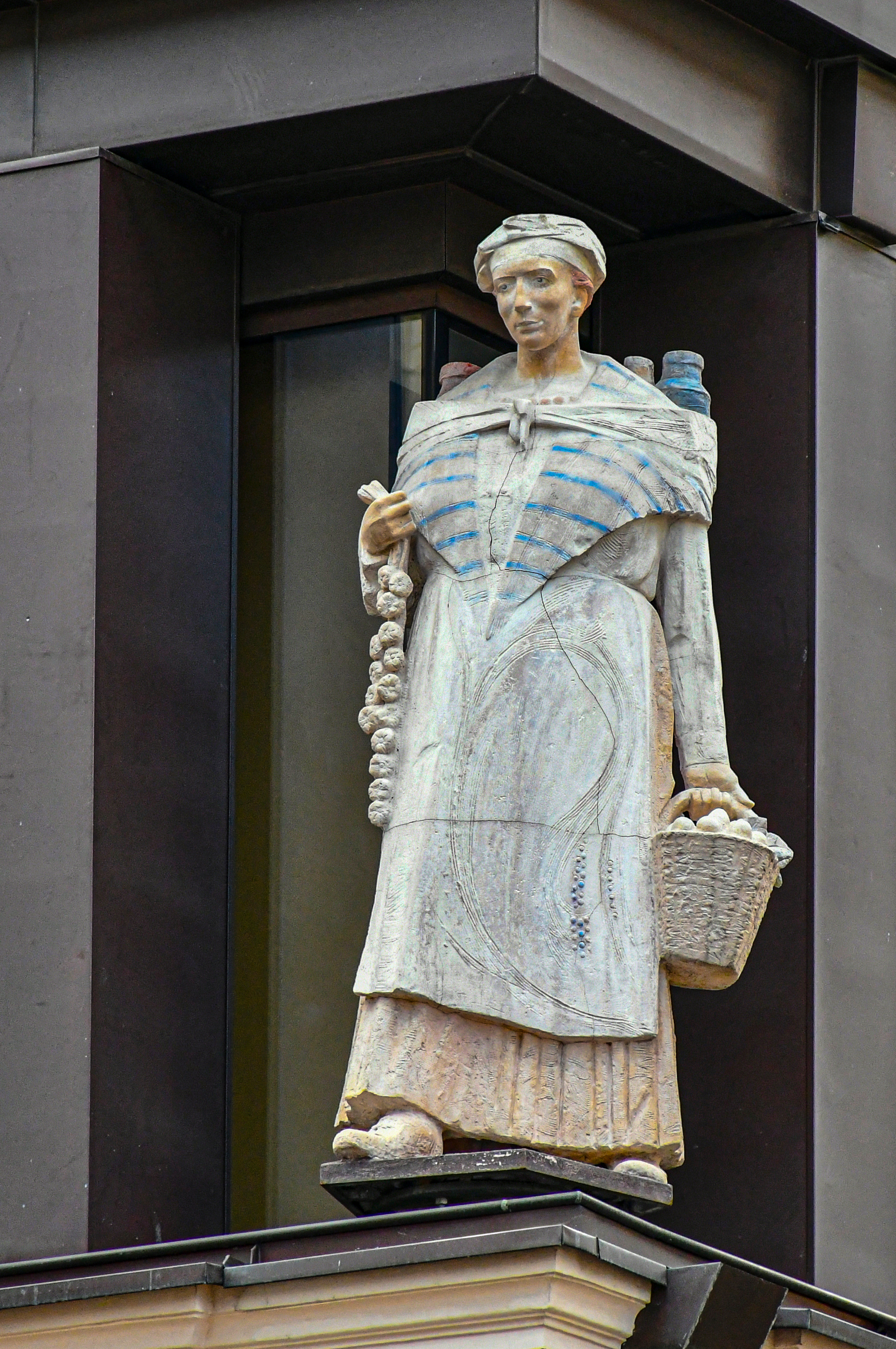
Memorial to a Kraków vendor, Szczepański Square, Kraków, Poland

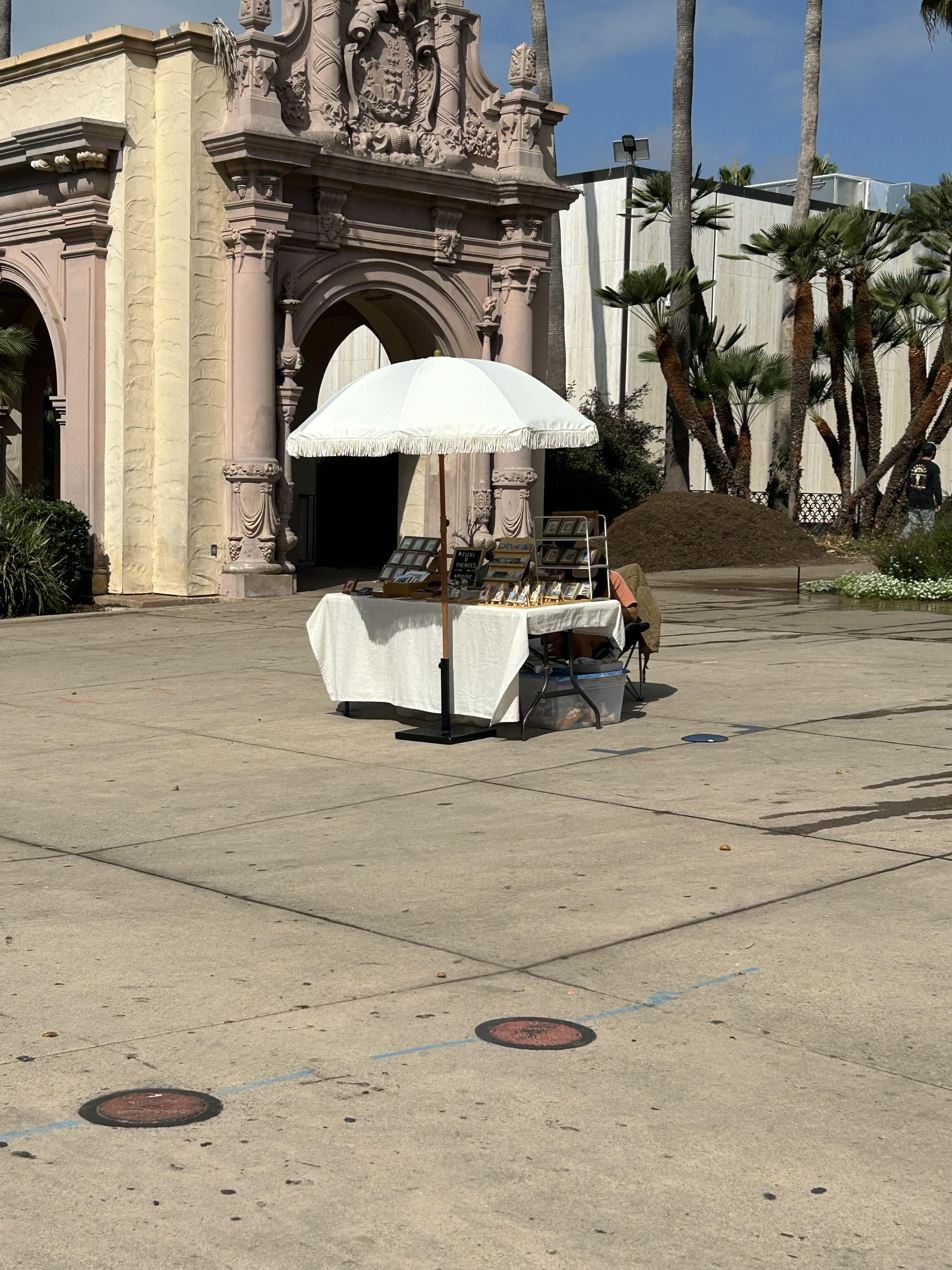
Vendor in Balboa Park, 2024

In a supply chain, a vendor, supplier, provider or a seller, is an enterprise that contributes goods or services. Generally, a supply chain vendor manufactures inventory/stock items and sells them to the next link in the chain. Today, these terms refer to a supplier of any goods or service. In property sales, the vendor is the name given to the seller of the property.

== Description ==
A vendor is a supply chain management term that means anyone who provides goods or services of experience to another entity. Vendors may sell B2B (business-to-business; i.e., to other companies), B2C (business to consumers or direct-to-consumer), or B2G (business to government). Some vendors manufacture inventoriable items and then sell those items to customers, while other vendors offer services or experiences. The terms vendor and supplier are often used indifferently. One distinction which might be made is that the vendors sell the goods or services while the supplier provides the goods or services. In most business contexts, except retail, this difference has no impact and the words are interchangeable.

A well-established explanation of the term "preferred supplier", coming from the Chartered Institute of Procurement & Supply, refers to "contractors or sellers that provide favourable trading terms or items that are highly desirable to a business". The contrasting term "residual supplier" applies to a country that supplies the world market only after importers have met their initial needs from preferred suppliers. A residual supplier is not initially competitive because of higher prices or lower quality.

Typically vendors are tracked in either a finance system or a warehouse management system.

Vendors are often managed with a vendor compliance checklist or vendor quality audits, and these activities can be effectively managed by software tools.

Purchase orders are usually used as a contractual agreement with vendors to buy goods or services.

Vendors may or may not function as distributors or manufacturers of goods. If vendors are also manufacturers, they may either build to stock or build to order.

"Vendor" is often a generic term, used for suppliers of industries from retail sales to manufacturers to city organizations. The term generally applies only to the immediate seller, or the organization that is paid for the goods, rather than to the original manufacturer or the organization performing the service if it is different from the immediate supplier.

== Types ==
There are four basic sorts of vendors in the supply chain, and companies and business owners play diverse roles. Manufacturers transform raw materials into finished goods in a series of steps. Retailers sell things. In a retail context, companies that provide goods for retailers to sell are their suppliers. Service providers provide services such as maintenance or labour to customers. Wholesalers source products from manufacturers and resell them to retail establishments, distributors, and other buyers. They serve as crucial intermediaries in the supply chain, offering competitive pricing and convenient purchasing options.

The resale of a product by a company requires a vendor relationships with a supplier. Vendor registration entails several steps in the process, including completing a credit application, placing a company credit card on file for payments, giving them the company phone number, and establishing payment terms.

A further distinction is sometimes made between domestic and international or foreign suppliers, e.g. in the United States, Buy American rulings refer to "domestic suppliers". Foreign supplies may retain contacts in countries in which they wish to develop sales: Robi Bendorf notes that the sales contacts of foreign suppliers covering the United States "exist in all traditional supplier forms including sales representatives, agents, distributors, importers, direct sales offices, trading companies [and] brokers".

In the automotive industry, a "directed-buy" supplier is a component supplier whose use by vendors is mandated by the client.

== Vendor selection ==
Selection of vendors or suppliers is a key function within a procurement organization. Baily et al. refer to a number of information sources typically used by buyers to help them select suppliers, including suppliers' reputation, their own supplier evaluation processes, records of suppliers used previously, and approved lists of suppliers.

== Vendor de-listing ==
De-listing refers to withdrawal of a supplier or their products from a company's supply chain. The UK's Groceries Supply Code of Practice also includes "significant" reductions in volumes purchased and supplied within its definition of "de-listing", and sets out good practice to be followed when de-listing occurs. At the Groceries Code Adjudicator's annual conference with suppliers and retailers in 2024 detailed discussions took place about best practice and "fair and reasonable timeframe[s]" for issuing and implementing de-listing notifications.

== Property sales ==
In property sales, the vendor is the name given to the seller of a property, while the buyer is referred to as the "purchaser".

== See also ==
- Peddling
- Retailer
- Wholesaler
