= Tokio Marine Kiln =

Multinational insurance company

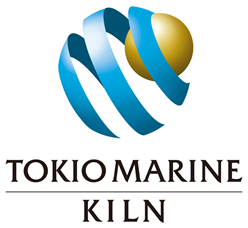
- Company type: Subsidiary
- Industry: Insurance
- Founded: 2014
- Headquarters: London, United Kingdom
- Area served: Global
- Key people: Chris Williams, Chairman; Charles Franks, Chief Executive Officer; Reeken Patel, Chief Financial Officer
- Products: Specialty insurance products including Corporate Property, Liability, Construction, Marine, Enterprise Risk, Accident & Health, Aviation, Reinsurance
- Revenue: £1.5 billion
- Owner: Tokio Marine Nichido
- Number of employees: 800
- Website: http://www.tokiomarinekiln.com

Tokio Marine Kiln is a global specialist insurance company with offices in London, Shanghai, Singapore and Rio de Janeiro. It was formed in 2014 after a merger between R.J Kiln and Tokio Marine Europe.

== History ==
Tokio Marine Kiln was formed in 2014 by the merger of R.J. Kiln and Tokio Marine Europe. R.J Kiln had been purchased by the Tokio Marine Group in 2007 for £442m and was subsequently delisted from the London Stock Exchange. After seven years running as an independent subsidiary of the Tokio Marine Group, it was merged with Tokio Marine Europe. R.J Kiln was founded by Robert Kiln in 1963 as a specialist Lloyd's of London insurance syndicate.

Tokio Marine Europe was founded in 1888 as the European arm of the Tokio Marine Group.
