= PURE Insurance =

American property insurance company

- Industry: Property insurance
- Headquarters: White Plains, New York
- Owner: Tokio Marine

Privilege Underwriters Reciprocal Exchange (PURE) is an American property insurance company established in 2006.

== Business model ==
PURE caters to high-net-worth customers. It offers insurance for homes with a rebuild value of more than one million dollars, automobiles, watercraft, jewelry, art and other collections, personal excess liability (umbrella), and flood. The company is based in White Plains, New York. PURE is a member of the PURE Group of Insurance Companies (the PURE Group).

=== Breach of sanctions ===
Between 2018 and 2020 PURE Insurance assisted Viktor Vekselberg, a Russian oligarch, with $315,891 of transactions in breach of sanctions and was accordingly fined $466,200 by OFAC in 2023.

== See also ==
- PURE Insurance Championship
