= Saint-Ouen flea market =

Complex of flea markets in Saint-Ouen-sur-Seine, France

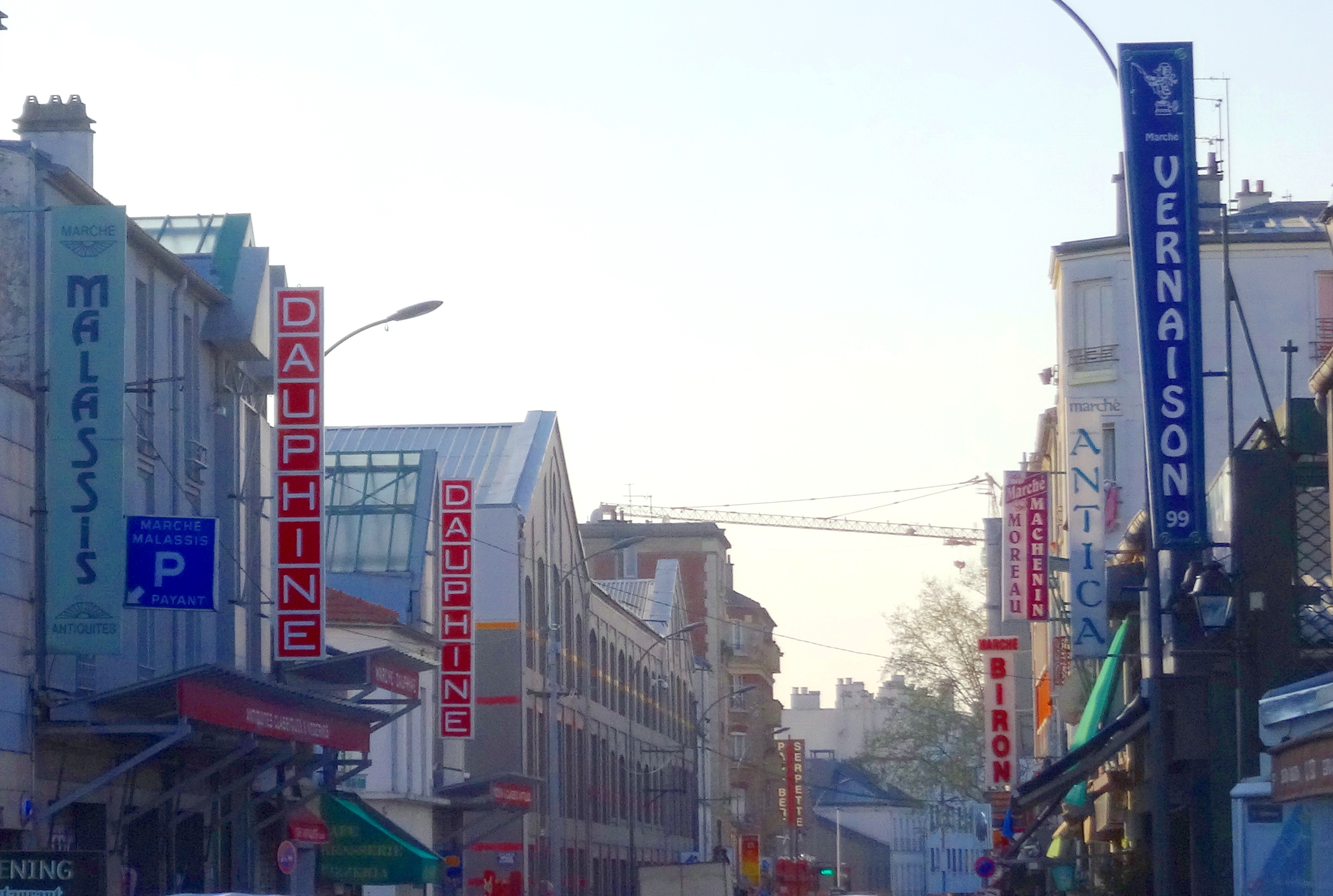
- Markets on the Rue des Rosiers
- Location: Saint-Ouen-sur-Seine, France; 48.902440°N 2.341939°E
- Opening date: 1885
- Days normally open: Saturday, Sunday, Monday
- Website: pucesdeparissaintouen.com
- Interactive map of Saint-Ouen flea market

The Saint-Ouen flea market, called marché aux puces de Saint-Ouen in French (French: [maʁʃe o pys də sɛ̃.t‿wɛ̃]) or simply St.-Ouen (French: [sɛ̃.t‿wɛ̃]), and also known as the Clignancourt flea market, is a complex of flea markets in Saint-Ouen-sur-Seine, in the northern suburbs of Paris.

The complex consists of a series of covered markets (marchés couverts) and shopping streets, (Note: Sources vary on the number of markets: the 2024 New York Times counted 11; the 2014 New York Times counted 14; the 2006 Veranda and 2003 Country Living each counted 12; and the 1985 New York Times counted seven. The variation likely reflects both changes over time and differences in how individual sections are defined.) and is large enough that first-time visitors can find it disorienting. Its individual markets range from stalls selling bric-à-brac and secondhand clothing to galleries dealing in museum-quality antiques. Dozens of restaurants and bistros operate within the complex. Bargaining is customary.

== History ==
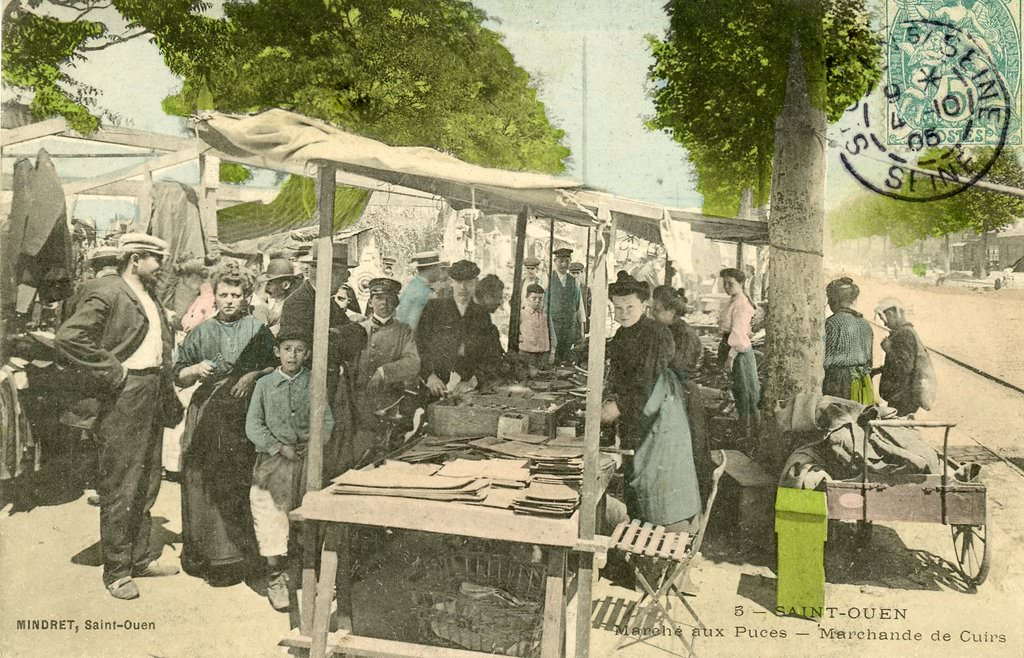
Vendors and shoppers at the Saint-Ouen flea market, early 20th century

The market began in 1885, when junk dealers and rag pickers were moved out of Paris to the plain of Saint-Ouen-sur-Seine, near the Porte de Clignancourt. There, they sold secondhand goods to Parisians passing through. The name marché aux puces, literally "market of fleas", dates to this period.

The market steadily expanded from stables and garages to absorb much of the surrounding neighborhood. By the 1920s, the market was frequented by designers and tastemakers, with the majority of its antiques eventually bound for buyers in the United States. Marché Biron, founded in 1925 by 70 merchants operating as a collective, was among the first to specialize in antiques. Until the mid-1930s, St.-Ouen was a cheaper place to buy certain goods, such as oil and soap, that were not taxed outside of the city limits.

By the early 1980s, the market drew 150,000 visitors each weekend to 10,000 vendors across 75 acres, although high rents for vendors and a weakening dollar made bargains harder for international visitors to find.

Interest in the market revived in the 2010s, despite competition from online antiques vendors. In 2013, furniture company Habitat converted a courtyard of former ateliers on the Rue des Rosiers into gallery-like retail spaces. The following year, media executive Jean-Cyrille Boutmy acquired Paul Bert Serpette and introduced methods to verify the authenticity of goods sold there. Saint-Ouen had three consecutive Communist mayors between 1945 and 2014, which may have helped the market resist the gentrification that reshaped Portobello Road.

== Markets ==
Market	Est.	Description	Image	Ref.
Antica		Around a dozen stands specializing in 18th- and 19th-century furniture, paintings, bronzes, and porcelain.	Vintage shop interior with mixed-media artwork on walls and painted jackets on mannequins among antique furniture and lamps	
Biron	1925	Antiques, including gilded furniture, jewelry, silver, and porcelain. The most expensive of the markets.	Covered market lane with small vintage shops and cafés under awnings	
Cambo	1970	Furniture and decorative objects from the 18th to 20th centuries, including Art Nouveau and Art Deco pieces, across two floors.		
Dauphine	1991	Antiquarian books and prints.	Covered market gallery seen from above, with record shops and boutiques on narrow walkways under a green metal-and-glass roof	
l'Entrepôt	1990	Large-format architectural salvage, including bookcases, fireplaces, ironwork, and staircases.		
Jules-Vallès	1938	Bric-a-brac and secondhand goods.	Painted mural of a man with a wheelbarrow	
Malassis	1989	Antiques across two floors.	Covered market arcade with antique furniture, patterned rugs, carved tables, and textiles along a tiled walkway	
Malik	1942	Secondhand clothing and household goods.	Indoor market aisle lined with clothing stalls and mannequins under red metal beams and glass roof	
Le Passage	Late 1980s	Books, postcards, vintage clothing, and antiques, in a covered passageway connecting Rue Jules-Vallès and Rue Lécuyer.		
Paul-Bert Serpette	1946 (Paul‑Bert); 1977 (Serpette)	Furniture and design. Rents are among the highest at Saint-Ouen.	Red facade with entrance under bold white lettering and blue awning	
l'Usine		Antique and 20th-century designer furniture, open to trade professionals only on weekday mornings.		
Vernaison	1920	The oldest market. Around 300 stalls selling small collectibles, vintage linens, and ephemera.		

== Other flea markets in Paris ==
Paris has several other flea markets:

- Marché d'Aligre in the 12th arrondissement, a food market that hosts a secondhand market on Sundays
- Puces du Kremlin-Bicêtre in Le Kremlin-Bicêtre, on the southern edge of the city
- Puces de Montreuil in Montreuil, on the eastern edge
- Puces de Vanves in the 14th arrondissement, an open-air market on the southern edge of the city
