= Groceries Code Adjudicator =

Retail supply ombudsman in the UK

Ombudsman overview
- Formed: 25 June 2013; 13 years ago
- Jurisdiction: England and Wales; Scotland; Northern Ireland
- Headquarters: 7th Floor, The Cabot 25 Cabot Square Canary Wharf London E14 4QZ United Kingdom
- Employees: 4.6 full time equivalents
- Ombudsman executive: Mark White, Groceries Code Adjudicator
- Parent department: Department for Environment, Food and Rural Affairs
- Website: gov.uk/government/organisations/groceries-code-adjudicator

The Groceries Code Adjudicator (or Supermarket Ombudsman) is an independent statutory office established to enforce the Groceries Supply Code of Practice and to regulate the relationship between supermarkets and their direct suppliers within the United Kingdom. The post was created by the Groceries Code Adjudicator Act 2013 and is an independent office within the Department for Environment, Food and Rural Affairs.

The UK Competition Commission (as of 1 April 2014 the Competition and Markets Authority or CMA) undertook an investigation of grocery retail in 2009, and recommended that the government establish an ombudsman for the sector. The Groceries Supply Code of Practice applied initially to ten retailers with an annual turnover of £1bn+, namely Tesco, Co-op, Sainsbury’s, Marks and Spencer, Asda, Lidl, Morrisons, Aldi, Waitrose, and Iceland. On 9 February 2022, the CMA announced that Amazon.com would also be included with effect from 1 March 2022.

Trade magazine and website Retail Week reported that in response to calls for submissions to the Competition Commission investigation, major UK retailer Aldi supported the establishment of a retail ombudsman, while Tesco, Sainsbury's, and a number of other major retailers did not support its establishment.

In January 2013 Christine Tacon was appointed to the role for a four-year period. Mark White, the current adjudicator, was appointed in October 2020.

The Adjudicator publishes interpretative guidance on the Code of Practice, best practice statements and details of retailers' voluntary commitments and arbitrates in disputes between retailers and suppliers.

On 1 July 2026, sponsorship of the Adjudicator transferred from the Department for Business and Trade to the Department for Environment, Food and Rural Affairs.

== Best practice statements ==
Areas covered by best practice statements include forecasting and handling consumer complaints. Forecasting was covered by a review of practice and statement in aid of "better working practices" issued in March 2016: the scope of this statement was extended to cover sales promotions when it was reissued in June 2018.

== Investigations ==
Christine Tacon's first investigation, announced on 5 February 2015, looked into the supply chain activities of Tesco plc. The investigation found that Tesco had breached the delayed payment provisions of the Code, but in respect of the rule that no payments should be required from suppliers for better positioning of goods unless in relation to promotions, no evidence of a breach was found.

In her work on the Tesco investigation, Tacon identified problems with "drop and drive deliveries" as one of her "top five issues", because they can be a cause of delay in payments to suppliers for goods received. "Drop and drive" disputes involve deductions made in supplier payments because of "alleged discrepancies" in delivered quantities. As a result, work was undertaken with a group of 20 supermarket suppliers and consultancy firm Simply Supply Chain, which highlighted concerns regarding inaccurate claims being made by the supermarkets. As of February 2015 the GCA withdrew from handling concerns over the drop and drive issue so that an industry-led solution could emerge. Morrisons and Asda later introduced a "Good Faith Receiving" process, under which they agreed to pay suppliers for all drop and drive deliveries, using spot check audits to ensure accuracy, and the Co-op had agreed to pay all drop and drive delivery invoices in full and settle any disputes later by mutual agreement.

Tacon's other "top issues" were:

- Supermarkets' unilateral deductions for allegedly short deliveries
- Duplicate invoicing and unilateral deductions for unknown or unagreed items
- Unilateral deductions covering promotion fees, and
- Delays in paying entire invoices when only a part of an invoice has been disputed.

== Appeals ==
Some decisions by the adjudicator can only be challenged by judicial review, for example a decision to commence an investigation or a ruling that a breach of the Code has occurred. Suppliers and retailers can challenge a decision on costs through an appeal to the courts or via arbitration, or alternatively via commercial litigation.
