= Groceries Supply Code of Practice =

UK statutory instrument

The Groceries Supply Code of Practice, informally known as the Groceries Code, regulates the relationship between food suppliers and a number of designated large retailers, a list of which is maintained by the government. It was set out by the Groceries (Supply Chain Practices) Market Investigation Order 2009, a regulatory order made by the Competition Commission using powers from the Enterprise Act 2002 to regulate the supply chain of the British retail grocery industry.

== Code of practice ==
=== Designated retailers ===
The designated retailers were defined to be companies in the grocery retail business with a turnover of over £1 billion.

At the date of the creation of the Code of Practice, the designated retailers were:

- Aldi Süd
- Asda
- Co-operative Group
- Iceland
- Lidl
- Marks & Spencer
- Morrisons
- Sainsbury's
- Tesco
- Waitrose

Since then, the following retailers have been added to the list:

- Amazon
- B&M
- TJ Morris
- Ocado

== Code compliance ==
The 2019 Order requires each of the designated retailers to appoint a Code Compliance Officer (CCO), who can be contacted by the retailer's suppliers if they have any concerns about compliance with the code. The CCO must be independent of the retailer's buying section and the CCO is expected to deal in confidence with the supplier.

== See also ==
- Groceries Code Adjudicator
