= Tokio Marine HCC =

International specialty insurance group

- Formerly: HCC Insurance Holdings
- Type: Private
- Industry: Insurance
- Founder: Stephen L. Way
- Fate: Acquired by Tokio Marine
- Headquarters: Houston, Texas, United States
- Area served: Global
- Key people: Susan Rivera (Chief Executive Officer); Barry Cook (Deputy Chief Executive Officer); Tom Weist (Chief Financial Officer)
- Revenue: $2.3 billion
- Net income: $345 million
- Number of employees: 3,000
- Divisions: Accident & Health, Surety & Credit, Directors & Officers and Professional Liability, U.S. Property & Casualty, International Property & Casualty
- Website: www.tmhcc.com

Tokio Marine HCC is an international insurance group with offices across the United States, the United Kingdom, Spain, and Ireland. The company is based in Houston, Texas, U.S.

== History ==
The company (formerly HCC Insurance Holdings, Inc.) was formed as Houston Casualty Company in 1974 by Stephen L. Way.

On June 10, 2015, the company announced it was being acquired by Japan's Tokio Marine for a fee of $7.5 billion. On October 27, 2015, the company announced the closing of the acquisition by Tokio Marine. The aggregate consideration paid in connection with the merger was approximately $7.5 billion, and the merger became effective at 4:05 p.m. EDT.

== Aviation ==
Aviation was the first line of insurance provided by Tokio Marine HCC. The company's insurance for aviation includes liability, cargo, and war. HCC Aviation insures approximately 45,000 aircraft in the United States and more than 60 countries worldwide.

Avemco Insurance Company was a stand-alone NYSE company acquired by Tokio Marine HCC in 1997. Avemco provides insurance policies for renters and borrowers of general aviation aircraft.

Houston Casualty Company Aviation (HC Aviation) writes a combination of international and U.S. commercial aviation insurance. USSIC Aviation writes General Aviation and special risk insurance. USSIC Aviation specializes in insuring warbirds (propeller- and jet-driven military surplus aircraft owned individually or held by aircraft museums).

== Liability ==
The company underwrites Directors and officers liability insurance through its HCC Global subsidiary. The company offers both domestic U.S. and international coverage. The company offers its international coverage through independent insurance brokers.

=== Accident and health ===
Tokio Marine HCC provides sports disability insurance for professional teams and individual athletes.

== International operations ==
Houston Casualty Company was authorized by Her Majesty's Treasury in 1998 to operate a full branch office in the United Kingdom. HCC has offices in the United Kingdom, Ireland, and Spain. Tokio Marine HCC is an owner of a Lloyd's managing agency and 100% capital provider of a Lloyd's syndicate.

In anticipation of Brexit, a new insurance company, Tokio Marine Europe S.A. (TME), was set up in Luxembourg, following regulatory approval from the Commissariat aux Assurances (CAA) and the Japanese Financial Services Authority (JFSA). TME operates as a subsidiary of HCC International Insurance Company plc. in partnership with Tokio Marine Kiln. With approval from the High Court of England and Wales, the Part VII process of transferring the existing portfolio of policies written out of Continental European operations to Tokio Marine Europe S.A. was executed.

On May 7, 2018, S&P Global Ratings assigned Tokio Marine Europe S.A. a "AA- (Very Strong)" financial strength rating.

== Acquisitions ==
- In 1996, the company acquired LDG Management Company.
- In 1997, the company acquired Managed Group Underwriting.
- In 1998, the company acquired Guarantee Insurance Resources.
- In 1999, the company acquired Centris Group Inc. (insurance company). The same year, the company also acquired Midwest Stop Loss Underwriters.
- In 2002, the company acquired Dickson Manchester Ltd. and MAG Global Financial Products.
- In 2004, the company acquired American Contractors Indemnity Company and RA&MCO Insurance companies.
- In 2005, the company acquired US Surety company, DeMontfort Group, Ltd., Perico Ltd., MIC Life Insurance, and the Ilium Insurance Group.
- In 2006, the company acquired Novia Underwriters, Inc., G.B. Kenrick & Associates, and the Health Products Division of Allianz Life Insurance.
- In 2008, the company acquired Cox Insurance Group, Arrowhead Public Risk, VMGU Insurance Agency, the Surety Company of the Pacific, and MultiNational Underwriters.
- In 2009, the company sold its reinsurance brokerage business Rattner MacKenzie Limited and transferred rights relating to brown water marine to its original owner. The company also combined two of its Lloyd's syndicates. The company formed a Property Treaty underwriting team.
- In 2010, the company started a Technical Property division.
- In 2011, the company opened Primary Casualty and Excess Casualty divisions.
- In 2013, the company expanded into the North American construction property risks market and began offering builders risk treaty reinsurance from its London office.
- In 2015, the company acquired Producers Ag Insurance Group (ProAg), a writer of crop insurance.
- In 2016, the company acquired Bail USA, Inc., a wholesale bail agency and On Call International.
- In 2017, the company acquired AIG's Medical Stop-Loss and Organ Transplant operations.
- In 2018, the company acquired Qdos Contractor, a provider of insurance products and services to the UK.
- In 2019, the company acquired NAS Insurance Services, LLC.
- In 2020, the company acquired GCube.
