= James Cracchiolo =

American businessman

James M. Cracchiolo
- Born: 1958 (age 67–68)
- Education: NYU Stern School of Business
- Occupations: Chairman & CEO of Ameriprise Financial, Inc.,

James "Jim" Cracchiolo (born 1958) is an American businessman. He is the chairman and CEO of Ameriprise Financial, Inc., a leading diversified financial services company serving the comprehensive financial planning needs of the mass affluent and affluent. He has held these positions since September 2005, when the company was spun off from American Express. From 2003 to present, he has also been Chairman of Threadneedle Asset Management, a London-based global asset management firm.

== Past positions ==
Prior to his current role, Cracchiolo held a number of senior-level positions at American Express, including:

- Group President, American Express Global Financial Services 2000-2005
  - Chairman, CEO and President of American Express Financial Advisors
  - Chairman of American Express Bank
  - CEO of Travel Related Services
- President and CEO of Travel Related Services (TRS) International 1998-2000
- President of Global Network Services 1997-1998
- Senior Vice President of TRS Quality, Global Reengineering 1993-1997
- Executive Vice President and Chief Financial Officer of Shearson Lehman Brothers (then a unit of American Express) 1990-1993

== Education ==
Cracchiolo obtained a Bachelor of Science degree in accounting and economics and a Master of Business Administration degree in finance, both from the New York University Stern School of Business. He is a licensed Certified Public Accountant in New York State and is Financial Industry Regulatory Authority (FINRA) Series 7 and 24 certified in the United States.

== Ameriprise ==
Ameriprise turned down the roughly $2.5 billion federal bailout money it was offered as part of the United States government's Troubled Asset Relief Program during the subprime mortgage crisis in 2008. Cracchiolo, in a statement, said the company is "confident that our current capital position and access to potential additional funding sources are more than adequate."

Under Cracchiolo's leadership, Ameriprise completed its $1.2 billion acquisition of Columbia Management's long-term asset management business from Bank of America Corporation in May 2010. This deal is expected to improve the profit margins of Ameriprise's asset management business by 25 percent within two years and make Ameriprise the eighth-largest manager of long-term mutual funds in the U.S.

Cracchiolo has named India as an important market for Ameriprise; the company began India operations in 2012, thus becoming the first multibillion-dollar company operating purely in the financial planning space in that country.

=== Compensation ===
Cracchiolo earned a total compensation of $18.83 million in 2010, which included a base salary of $0.95 million, a cash bonus of $9.43 million, and options granted worth $5.43 million, and other compensation totaling $3.02 million.

Cracchiolo received a 44% pay raise in 2017, earning $23.9 million in direct compensation and cashing in on $40.8 million in stock options.

== Recognition ==
- Cracchiolo was named in "The 20 to Watch in 2006" by Twin Cities Business magazine.
- A month after Ameriprise's spin-off from American Express, Cracchiolo was named one of "The Ten to Watch 2005" among leaders of brokerage, financial advisor and financial planning firms in the U.S by Registered Rep, a magazine for retail investment professionals.
- Cracchiolo was named in "The Power 100" annual list of emerging executives in the finance industry.

== Organizational involvement ==
- Cracchiolo is a member of the American Council of Life Insurers, the Business and Financial Services Roundtables, and the Minnesota Business Partnership.
- He is also a member of the Board of Advisors of the March of Dimes Foundation.
