= Konecta =

- Type: Private
- Industry: Business process outsourcing
- Founded: 1999; 27 years ago
- Founder: José María Pacheco
- Headquarters: Madrid, Spain
- Area served: Europe, Middle East
- Key people: Nourdine Bihmane (CEO)
- Services: Customer experience, consulting, technology-enabled business services
- Owner: Intermediate Capital Group
- Website: konecta.com

Konecta is a Spanish multinational services and technology company based in Madrid.

== History ==
Konecta was founded in Spain in 1999 by José María Pacheco. Banco Santander was both a client of the company and a shareholder, for which Konecta provided call center services. In 2015, PAI Partners invested in Konecta, becoming a shareholder alongside Banco Santander and Pacheco.

In February 2019, Banco Santander and PAI Partners agreed to sell Konecta to Intermediate Capital Group, together with Pacheco and the management team. In April 2022, Konecta and the Italian outsourcing group Comdata agreed to merge, creating one of the largest CX BPO groups globally. The combined group unified its operations under the Konecta name in 2023.

In April 2024, Nourdine Bihmane, formerly chief executive of Atos, was appointed group CEO.

In 2025, Konecta launched a three-year transformation plan, Katalyst 2028, focused on AI and digital services.

== Operations ==
Konecta provides outsourced customer experience (CX) and customer management services, as well as consulting and technology-enabled business services. Following its merger with Comdata, the company expanded its operations across Europe and the Middle East. In 2025, Konecta acquired Speak33 in France and Sales Performance in Italy.

== Controversies ==
In July 2012, Konecta reported that employees participating in a strike in Chile had engaged in actions such as blocking infrastructure, threatening staff, and damaging company property. Trade unions disputed these claims and described the strike as lawful.

In August 2022, four employees at Konecta's Avilés center in Asturias, Spain, were dismissed on performance grounds. The union Corriente Sindical de Izquierda (CSI) criticized the dismissals, arguing that they were unjustified and linked to labor conditions.
