= ICG Enterprise Trust =

British investment company

ICG Enterprise Trust plc
- Company type: Public Company
- Traded as: LSE: ICGT; FTSE 250 component
- Industry: Private Equity
- Founded: July 15, 1981
- Headquarters: London, United Kingdom
- Key people: Oliver Gardey (Head of Private Equity Funds Group)
- Products: Private equity assets
- Website: www.icg-enterprise.co.uk

ICG Enterprise Trust plc (formerly Graphite Enterprise Trust plc and before that F&C Enterprise Trust plc) is a large investment company. It is listed on the London Stock Exchange and is a constituent of the FTSE 250 Index.

== History ==
The company was first listed on the London Stock Exchange in 1981 as an investment trust specialising in providing venture capital for unquoted companies mainly in Europe and the US. After personal equity plans ('PEP's) were introduced by the Chancellor of the Exchequer, Nigel Lawson in 1987, the company was one of only three investment trusts, and the only one specialising in venture capital to feature in the PEP performance leagues. The company developed a strong reputation for investment performance and was the UK's best performing investment trust between 1992 and 1997.

It was managed by F&C Asset Management as F&C Enterprise Trust plc until May 2001, then by Graphite Capital as Graphite Enterprise Trust plc until February 2016, and then by Intermediate Capital Group as ICG Enterprise Trust since then.

The chair is Jane Tufnell.

== Significant venture capital investments ==
Significant venture capital investments in unquoted companies involving ICG Enterprise Trust include:

- Olicom, a Danish computer software business
- Wagamama, a restaurant chain specialising in Japanese cuisine
- Weetabix, a food processing business
- Huntress Group, a UK white-collar recruitment specialist
- Kwik Fit, a car service and repair business
- Park Holidays UK, formerly Cinque Ports, a caravan parks business
- The Groucho Club, a Bohemian London club for people from the publishing, media, entertainment and arts industries
- Micheldever Group, the UK's second largest distributor of tyres
- The Laine Pub Company, a Brighton-based pub business with 54 public houses
