= Hawksmoor (restaurant) =

British steakhouse and cocktail bar chain

Underdog Restaurants Ltd.
- Trade name: Hawksmoor
- Industry: Hospitality
- Founded: 2006
- Headquarters: London, England, UK
- Number of locations: 13 restaurants (2025)
- Owner: Graphite Capital
- Website: thehawksmoor.com

Hawksmoor is a British steakhouse and cocktail bar chain based in London, England.

== Development ==
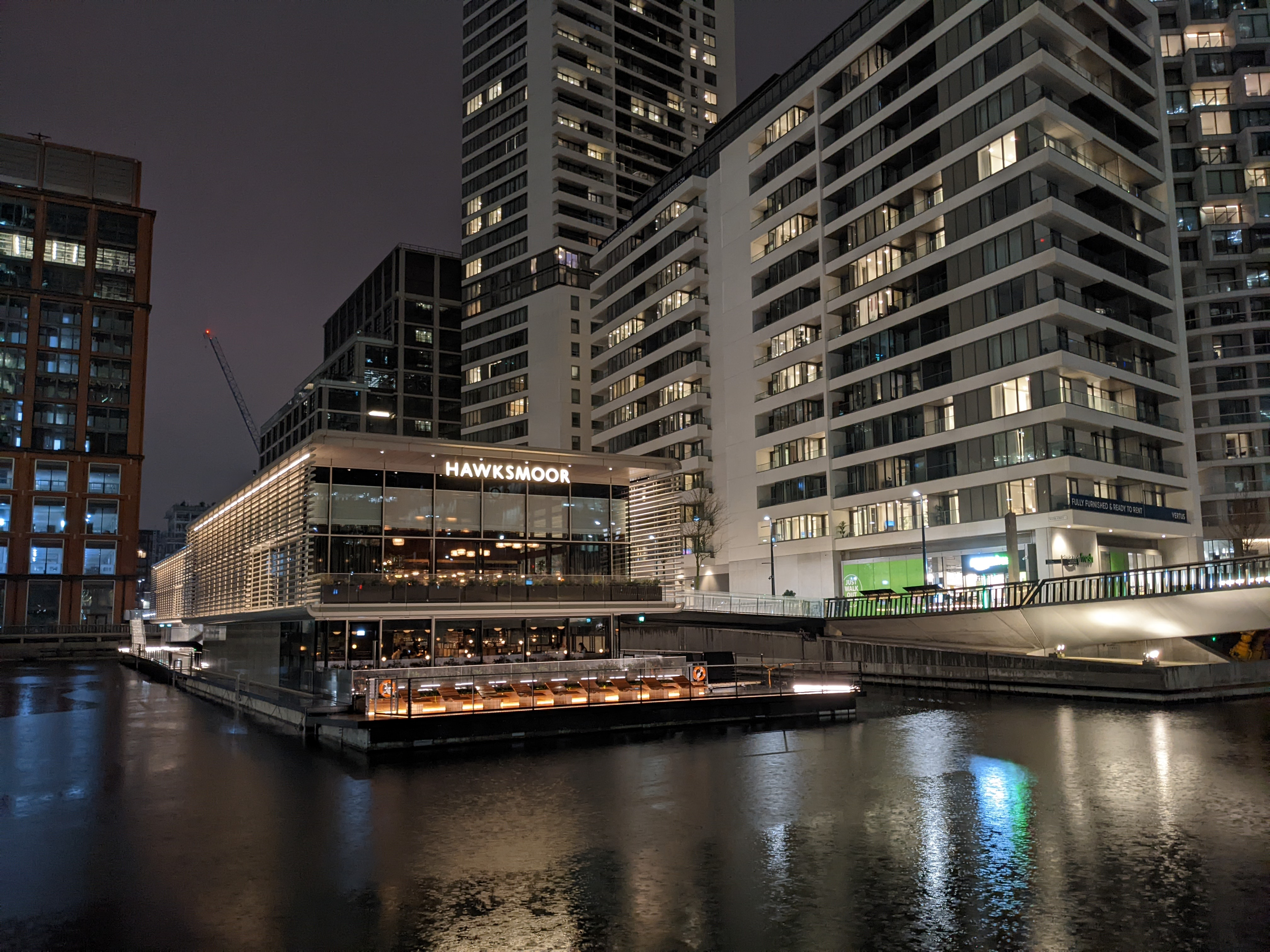
Hawksmoor restaurant and bar in Wood Wharf, London

The restaurant was founded by Will Beckett and Huw Gott in 2006. They had previously worked in bars and kitchens in London's East End and opened their new bar/restaurant on Commercial Street. Their plan was to offer high-quality well-butchered beef, so they tasted a range of beef from all over the world, until coming to the conclusion that the best-tasting steak was from the UK.

Their second branch, in Seven Dials, opened in 2010. This was especially successful and the turnover of their company, Underdog, increased from £4 million to £11 million.

The company has been ranked three-star in the Sunday Times Best Companies for eight consecutive years. In 2020 it had been in the Sunday Times "100 Best Companies to Work for" list for nine consecutive years. It was in the three-star Sustainable Restaurant Association award, and was being involved in a variety of charity projects (predominantly for Action Against Hunger, for which Hawksmoor said in 2022 that it had raised and donated over £1.25m. Hawksmoor's 2025 menus state that they had raised almost £2 million for the charity.).

== Ownership ==
In 2013, the founders sold a majority stake in the chain to the private equity group Graphite Capital — investors in other London businesses such as the Groucho Club and Wagamama.

The valuation was £35 million but the founders planned to continue to work and invest in the business.

In 2024 the company was reported to be up for sale, hoping to expand its overseas operation, with restaurants in Chicago, Dublin, and New York, in addition to ten in the UK, at the time. Graphite Capital did not comment on "market rumours", and Hawksmoor was still listed in its portfolio in October 2025.

== News ==
Giles Coren, reviewing the Seven Dials branch in The Times, praised it as "great, great steak. Best you’ll find anywhere."

In July 2025, the restaurant group Hawksmoor asked far-right activist Tommy Robinson to leave one of its premises. A spokesperson for the company later issued a statement to The Caterer confirming the decision and reiterating the company's values.

== Locations ==
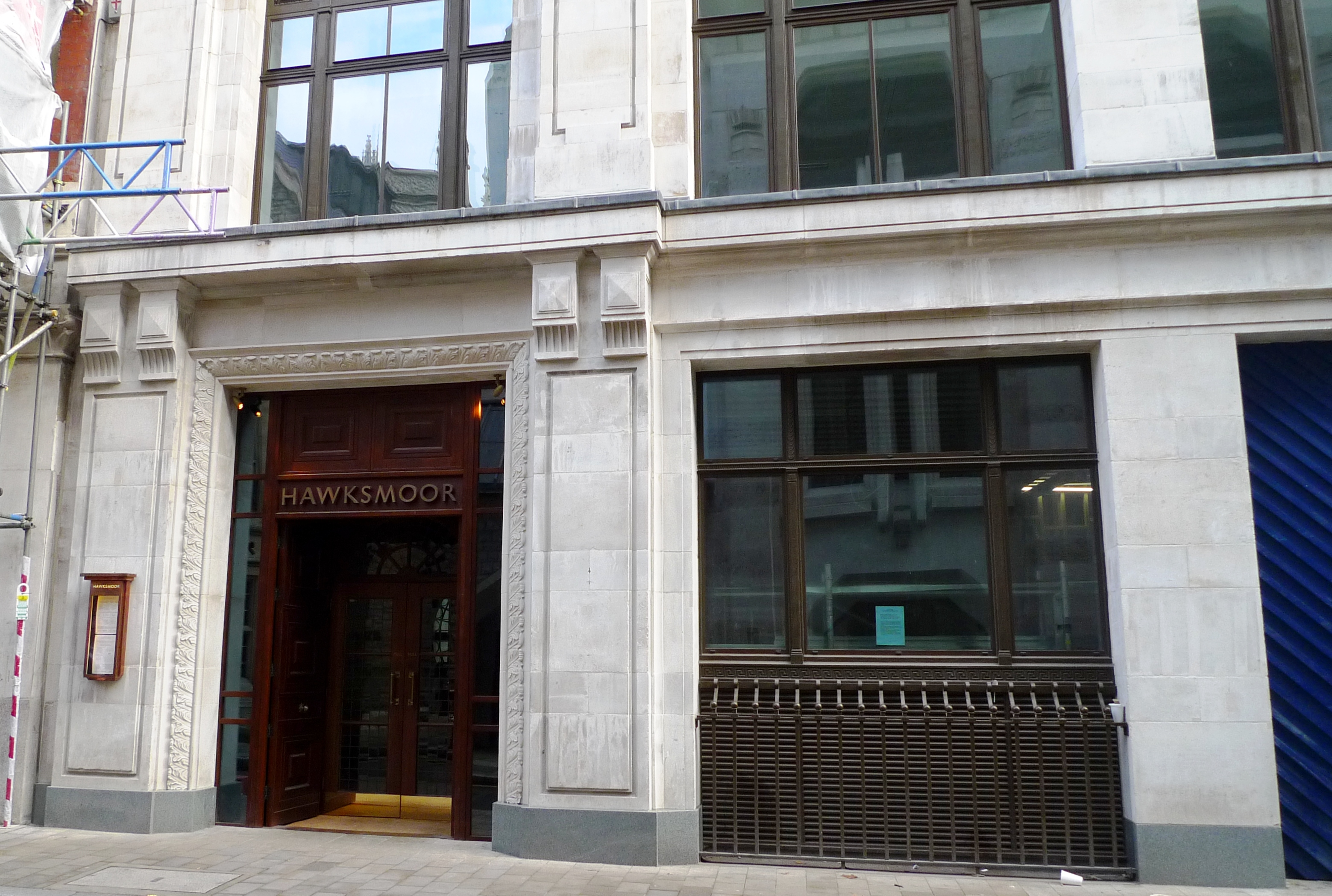
Hawksmoor Guildhall

As of 2026, Hawksmoor operates eight restaurants in London, in Air Street, Borough, Guildhall, Knightsbridge, Seven Dials, Spitalfields,Wood Wharf and St Pancras. Outside London, the group has restaurants in Edinburgh, Manchester and Liverpool. Internationally, Hawksmoor has restaurants in New York City, Chicago, Boston and Dublin.

== Awards ==
In February 2020, Hawksmoor was recognised at the Best Companies to Work For special awards 2020 in the "Innovation in Engagement" category.

== See also ==
- List of restaurants in London
