= Noodle (disambiguation) =

Noodles are a type of food.

Noodle or Noodles may also refer to:

== People ==
- Noodles (musician), Kevin John Wasserman, (born 1963) an American guitarist and member of the band Offspring
- Noodles, Masta Killa, (born 1969), a member of the musical group Wu-Tang Clan
- Noodles, Jamie McLennan, (born 1971), a Canadian sportscaster & former goaltender in the National Hockey League
- Noodles Hahn (Frank George Hahn, 1879–1960), American Major League Baseball player

== Arts, entertainment, and media ==
=== Fictional characters ===
- David "Noodles" Aaronson, the protagonist of 1952 novel Once Upon A Time In America
- Noodle (Gorillaz), a fictional member of the band Gorillaz
- Mr. Noodle, human character on Sesame Street
- Noodles (Usagi Yojimbo), a character in the comic books series Usagi Yojimbo
- Noodle, a fictional orphan girl from the 2023 film Wonka
- Noodle, a poodle in the Hairy Maclary and Friends book series

=== Other arts, entertainment, and media ===
- Noodle (film), a 2007 Israeli film
- Noodles (film), a 2023 Indian film
- Noodles (band), a Japanese rock music group

== Other uses ==
- Noodle, a guide for the cable on a bicycle brake
- Egg noodle, a form of pasta
- Noodles & Company, an American fast food restaurant chain
- Pool noodle, a piece of foam used while swimming
- Noodle, an education technology company founded by John Katzman
- Noodling, musical improvisation, often used in a pejorative sense
- Noodling, a term for opal mining in parts of Australia; see fossicking#Noodling
- Noodle (dog), a pet influencer popular for TikTok videos
- Noodle, Texas, a community in the United States

== See also ==
- Noodling, fishing for catfish with bare hands
- Searching for opals in mine detritus; see Fossicking § Noodling
- Noddle (disambiguation)
