= Edward Bramson =

British businessperson

Edward John Michael Bramson (born March 1951) is the chief executive officer and principal at Sherborne & Company Incorporated, described as an "activist investor" and "corporate raider". Bramson launched his first private equity firm, Hillside Capital, in New York in 1977, and launched Sherborne Investors as a "turnaround investment firm" in 2003.

Bramson has developed a distinctive modus operandi. He "typically" buys a sizeable stake, demands a seat on the board, and then pushes "for cost-cuts, payouts to shareholders and other changes that boost returns". Bramson's funds are estimated to have generated average annual returns of 22.8% in recent years. Among the companies targeted by Sherborne have been Electra Private Equity, and fund manager F&C Asset Management.

On 19 March 2018 Sherborne Investment Management announced that it had acquired the voting rights to 5.16% of Barclays shares effectively making Sherborne the bank's fourth largest shareholder behind the Capital Group, the Qatar Investment Authority and Blackrock. Sherborne's investment came after Barclays had announced a string of losses in the previous year including a £1.9 billion net loss on Payment Protection Insurance settlements and a £2.5 billion write-off of its African Business. As of August 2020 Sherborne's stake in Barclays stood at 5.9%.

In April 2019, Sherborne Investors LP wrote to Barclays shareholders asking for their support in its request to vote Mr. Bramson onto Barclays PLC's board as a non-executive director. Central to this request was Sherborne's contention that Barclays' Corporate and Investment Bank ("CIB") under-performed peers producing a -29% total return while UK comparables returned +3% and other CIB peers returned +74%.

In May 2019, Barclays' shareholders voted against Bramson joining the board (only 12.8% of shareholders backed his proposal).

Bramson was born in Paddington, London to a British mother and American father and emigrated to New York in 1975.
