= Get Britain Working =

UK government program

Get Britain Working was an initiative of the British Conservative–Liberal Democrat coalition government. As part of this scheme, young people on state benefits were offered unpaid work placement in companies. If they dropped out after the first week on the scheme, they might have had their benefits removed.

Local Get Britain Working plans are a feature of the employment policy of the 2024 Labour government.

== Coalition scheme ==
Critics of the coalition government's scheme have described it as a form of unpaid forced labour, with some critics describing it as "slave labour", and the negative publicity generated has caused a number of companies, including Sainsbury's, Waterstones, TK Maxx, Maplins, Mind and Burger King, to drop out of the scheme. Tesco announced that it would be voluntarily paying young people on the scheme. Other employers such as Argos and Superdrug were reviewing their position and seeking talks with the government.

In response to such developments, Conservative MP George Eustice told the BBC in February 2012 that firms involved in the scheme should "show more backbone" and resist pressure to leave the scheme. On 29 February, the government announced that they would be dropping the threat of removing benefits from participants in the scheme.

From January 2011 to May 2013, the program facilitated over 136,000 work experience starts, over 54,000 mentor starts, 26,000 weekly allowance starts and 61,000 pre-employment training starts, disproportionately recruiting white people.

== Labour government scheme ==
The Labour government published a white paper called "Get Britain Working" in November 2024.

== See also ==
- Workfare
- Work for the Dole
