= Maplin =

Maplin may refer to:

- Maplin (retailer), an electrical retailer in the UK and Ireland
- Maplin Sands, a series of mudflats on the northern bank of the Thames estuary
- Maplins, a fictional holiday camp from the sitcom Hi-de-Hi!
