= Graphite Capital =

British private equity firm

- Type: UK LLP
- Industry: Private Equity
- Predecessor: Foreign & Colonial Ventures Ltd.
- Founded: 1981; 45 years ago
- Headquarters: London, W1; United Kingdom
- Key people: Markus Golser, Andy Gray
- Products: Investments, private equity funds
- Total assets: £1.2 billion
- Website: www.graphitecapital.com

Graphite Capital is a private equity firm focused on mid-market leveraged buyout investments, primarily in the UK. The group manages around £1.2 billion for institutional investors, with the most recent fund raising over £500 million in 2018. Since 1991, the firm has backed almost 100 management teams through various investments.

The firm has managed private equity funds since 1981 and in 2001 became fully independent. The firm has a single office in Air Street in London's West End. The firm's Managing Partners are Andy Gray and Markus Golser, who joined in 1992 and 1997 respectively.

== History ==
Graphite Capital was originally part of F&C Asset Management and was known as Foreign & Colonial Ventures Ltd. The firm remained a subsidiary of F&C Asset Management until 2001, when the Graphite team completed a management buyout.

The first fund to be managed by Graphite Capital was F&C Enterprise Trust, a UK listed vehicle, which it renamed Graphite Enterprise Trust when the management buyout took place in 2001. The fund became ICG Enterprise Trust when the management contract was transferred to Intermediate Capital Group in 2016.

== Investments ==
The firm's ninth and most recent fund of £500 million raised in 2018 has backed the following companies, including:

- In October 2023, Storal, a national children's nursery group in England founded in 2016, together with OakNorth Bank
- In 2023, Independence Products Limited, a supplier of prescribed infection prevention products
- In October 2022, Digital Space, an information technology and cloud services provider formerly known as Timico, acquired from Horizon Capital
- In November 2021, Opus Talent Solutions – a Redcliffe based international company specializing in recruitment for the technology and renewable energy markets
- In July 2021, Wonderbly - a personalised children's book specialist formerly known as Lost My Name
- In November 2020, London-based Babble, a specialist communications technology provider to medium-sized companies, acquired from Lloyds TSB Development Capital
- In October 2020, Ten10, an independent quality engineering and software testing consultancy based in London, acquired from Livingbridge
- In August 2019, Horizon Care and Education, a provider of specialist care for children and adolescents, based in Cannock, England
- in May 2019, NRS Healthcare, a provider of mobility and disability aids and services

The firm's eighth fund, which was raised in 2013 and invested until 2018, has backed the following companies including:

- City & County Healthcare - a provider of home care services in the UK
- ICR Group - a provider of repair and maintenance services to the energy sector
- nGAGE Specialist Recruitment (formerly Human Capital Investment Group) - a recruitment business serving a range of niche areas within the public and private sectors
- Trenchard Aviation - a civil aircraft maintenance business focusing on cabin services
- New World Trading Company - a pub restaurant group
- Beck & Pollitzer - an industrial machinery installation and relocation specialist

Graphite's seventh fund, which was raised in 2007 and invested until 2013, backed companies including:

- U-POL - a manufacturer and distributor of automotive refinishing products
- Kurt Geiger - the luxury shoe retailer and wholesaler
- Education Personnel - a provider of supply teachers and teaching assistants to state schools in the UK
- Alexander Mann Solutions - a provider of recruitment process outsourcing
- National Fostering Agency - an independent children's fostering agency
- London Square - a house builder focused on prime sites within the M25
- Willowbrook Healthcare - a developer and operator or premium elderly care homes

The seventh fund's current portfolio also includes:

- Explore Learning - a provider of after school tuition for children aged between 5 and 14
- Hawksmoor - the operator of premium steak restaurants

Earlier investments include Corbin & King - the operator of signature restaurants in London, the Groucho Club which was sold in July 2015, Dominion Oil & Gas, NES Group, Wagamama and Park Holidays.

== Divestments ==
In August 2022, Graphite sold YSC Consulting, a provider of leadership consulting and management assessment, acquired from Livingbridge in 2017, to Accenture. In June 2022, the firm sold Random42, a producer of digital medical animation, to The Lockwood Group, a US medical communications company. In July 2021, the firm sold U-POL, a manufacturer and distributor of fillers, coatings and aerosols, to US firm Axalta Coating Systems.
