= Jeff Noddle =

American grocery industry executive

- Born: June 1, 1946 (age 80)
- Education: University of Iowa (BA)
- Title: former CEO, SuperValu
- Spouse: Linda (m. 1968)
- Children: 2

Jeffrey Noddle is a former executive chairman of SuperValu, the third-largest grocery retail company in the United States (as of 2008) and a leading food distributor. He was CEO from June 2001 to June 2009 and has been with SuperValu since 1976.

In addition to this role, Noddle is on several industry and corporate boards. He is a member of the boards of directors of Donaldson Company, Inc., Ameriprise Financial, Inc., The Food Industry Center at the University of Minnesota, chairman of the governance committee of the board of directors of the Independent Grocers Alliance, Inc. (IGA), and the Academy of Food Marketing at Saint Joseph’s University. In addition, he is a member of The Business Council, a national organization of CEOs.

Noddle is also active in Minneapolis civic affairs; on the Greater Twin Cities United Way board of directors and executive committee, the University of Minnesota Carlson School of Management’s board of overseers, and as a member of the executive committee of the Minnesota Business Partnership.

== History ==
The boys' mother, Edith Noddle, who died in 2003 at age 91, was a first-generation American whose family emigrated from Russia. Jeff learned his civic duty from this woman. She set up a metal box with a coin slot at home and family members contributed spare change until the box was full. Then the money was taken to the synagogue, which distributed it to the needy.

Their father, Robert Noddle, came to the United States in the early 1920s from Lithuania when he was in his late teens. He worked with a cousin in the scrap metal business in Nebraska City. Later, he moved to Omaha, where he operated a grocery and liquor store near 24th and Leavenworth Streets. Robert Noddle also owned a miniature golf course, and eventually went into the real estate business, working with a brother who was living in California. Robert Noddle died in 1963 at age 60.

Young Jeff sacked groceries in high school at the former Central Market, 16th and Harney Streets, where his mother once worked as a cashier. He worked at Hinky Dinky stores and warehouses during the summer while a student at the University of Iowa, where he graduated with a business degree with an emphasis on marketing. He has also attended the Wharton School's Executive Advanced Management Program and the Levinson Institute.

He married Linda on September 1, 1968, in Chicago, Illinois.

He earned his bachelor's degree from the University of Iowa in 1969. He started out by following his two older brothers through school and into the grocery business in Omaha area. Harlan Noddle was chairman of Noddle Development Co., which developed shopping centers all over the United States. He was an Omaha business and civic leader before his death from pancreatic cancer in December at age 69. Allan Noddle, was on the executive board of Royal Ahold, a Netherlands-based, international food service and supermarket company. Before retiring and returning to Omaha in 2002, Allan oversaw Ahold's stores in Central America, Latin America, Asia and the Asia Pacific.

He started his grocery management career at Grocer Sales, Western Division, Supermarkets Interstate moving from a trainee to director between 1971-1976.

=== At SuperValu ===
Noddle joined SuperValu as director of retail operations in 1976 and worked for their J.M. Jones division in Champaign, Ill. During his time there, he held a number of positions, including Director of Merchandising and Vice President of Marketing. Between 1982 and 1985, Noddle was president of SuperValu's Fargo division and its former Miami division. After 1985, he was corporate executive vice president of merchandising. Hitting his stride in 1995, he then was president and chief operating officer of Wholesale Food Companies (SuperValu), until 2000. Noddle was president of SuperValu, from 2000 to June 2005 while also COO from 2000 to 2001, and chairman since May 2002.

=== In the industry ===
He was chairman of the board of directors of The Food Marketing Institute (FMI).

=== Outside the industry ===
Noddle has been an independent director of Ameriprise Financial, Inc. since September 30, 2005. He has been Director of Donaldson Company Inc., since 2000. He was a director of General Cable Corp., from 1998 to December 2, 2004.

As a supporter of the Jewish Foundation, Noddle is also the 2009 chair for the Twin Cities United Way's fundraising effort.

== Awards ==
- 2008 Executive of the Year
- 2009 Herbert Hoover
- SuperValu Executive Chairman Jeff Noddle has been named the Network of Executive Women's Outstanding Champion for 2009. Noddle will receive the award on August 31 during a consumer products industry luncheon at the Grocery Manufacturers Association Executive Conference in Colorado Springs, Colo. The Outstanding Champion award is presented each year to a senior-level consumer products industry leader who has consistently championed the mission of the Network of Executive Women (NEW), created diverse, high-performance work teams, demonstrated the business imperative of diversity and inclusion, and challenged the industry to remain an employer of choice.
- In August 2009, Jeff was inducted into the Minnesota Grocers Association's Hall of Fame.
