= Jasmine Mander =

Canadian soccer coach (born 1995)

Personal information
- Full name: Jasmine Kaur Mander
- Date of birth: May 23, 1995 (age 31)
- Place of birth: Delta, British Columbia, Canada
- Height: 1.70 m (5 ft 7 in)
- Position: Midfielder

Team information
- Current team: Republic of Ireland (assistant)

Youth career
- SurDel SC
- Surrey FC
- Whitecaps FC Academy

College career
Years	Team	Apps	(Gls)
2014–2017	UBC Thunderbirds	63	(2)

International career
- Canada U15
- Canada U17

Managerial career
- 2014–2020: Whitecaps FC Academy
- 2021–2024: Canada (assistant)
- 2026–: Republic of Ireland (assistant)

Jasmine Kaur Mander (born May 23, 2005) is a Canadian soccer coach and former player who is an assistant coach for the Republic of Ireland national team. A midfielder in her playing career, she played college soccer for the UBC Thunderbirds. She has previously coached for the Whitecaps FC Academy and spent four years as an assistant coach for the Canada national team before being removed from her post following the Canada Soccer drone spying scandal.

== Early life ==
Mander was born and raised in Delta, British Columbia, where she attended Seaquam Secondary School. Both of her brothers played soccer, inspiring Mander to follow suit at the age of 4. She started off playing for local club SurDel SC before joining Surrey FC shortly thereafter. She then joined the Whitecaps FC Academy, where she led the Whitecaps to two CanWest conference championships and one national championship. Mander also represented British Columbia nationally, captaining her provincial team to a gold medal at the 2013 Canada Summer Games. She made her debut for the Canada under-15 national team at the age of 15 before going on to gain experience with the under-17s as well.

== College career ==
Mander played college soccer for the UBC Thunderbirds, reconnecting with her former Whitecaps youth coach Jesse Symons. One week before the season commenced, Mander tore her ACL. She underwent knee surgery to repair her ACL, but tore it yet again shortly after the operation. She was able to take the field for the first time in 2015, participating in 22 games en route to a CIS National Championship title. The following year, she was appointed as the Thunderbird's team captain. She departed from the program having scored twice in 63 appearanes over three seasons, earning Academic All-Canadian honors each year.

== Coaching career ==
=== Whitecaps FC Academy ===
While a student at the University of British Columbia, Mander returned to the Whitecaps FC Academy to coach. She was hired in 2014 and beame both the first student-athlete and youngest person in history to be named a head coach in the British Columbia Premier League. She also became a member of the British Columbia Soccer Association's Diversity and Inclusion committee, and was selected as a BC Soccer coach educator. In December 2020, the Network of Executive Women selected Mander as one of Canada's Top 100 Most Powerful Women in the category of arts, sports, and entertainment. Mander ended up coaching a total of seven years with the Whitecaps.

=== Canada ===
On January 2, 2021, Mander was hired as a performance analyst for the Canada national team. Just over six months later, she helped the team win gold at the 2020 Summer Olympics. Mander stayed on the coaching staff for the next few years, including during the 2023 FIFA Women's World Cup, in which Canada were eliminated in the group stage.

During the 2024 Summer Olympics, Mander became embroiled in the Canada Soccer drone spying scandal. During the group stage of the tournament, Mander's coworker, Joseph Lombardi, was caught flying a drone over practices of the New Zealand national team. Upon discovery of the drone, both Mander and Lombardi were removed from Canada's Olympic team and sent home immediately; investigations later revealed text messages between Mander and Lombardi that indicated Mander was aware of the spying.

On November 12, 2024, Mander was fired from the Canadian Soccer Association. She spent the next year away from soccer as she served a FIFA ban for her participation in the illicit activities. In October 2025, she published an essay about her experiences through the scandal, admitting she was complicit in Canada's drone spying culture, but criticizing the investigation summary's focus on individual responsibility as opposed to reflecting the broader organizational culture and oversight issues that she believed contributed to the incident.

=== Republic of Ireland ===
In February 2026, the Republic of Ireland national team added Mander to Carla Ward's coaching staff ahead of 2027 FIFA Women's World Cup qualification matches.

== Personal life ==
Both of Mander's parents were born in India. Mander speaks both English and Punjabi.

Mander graduated from the University of British Columbia with a bachelor's degree in kinesiology and a master's degree in physical therapy; she had been inspired to study physical therapy after her experience rehabbing her torn ACL in college.
