= Noddle =

Noddle may refer to:

- Alan Noddle, former president of Giant Food Stores
- Jeff Noddle, the executive chairman of SuperValu
- William Noddle, who settled on Noddle's Island (one of Boston Harbor Islands off East Boston, Massachusetts, USA) in 1629
- Noddle (credit report service), a former British credit report service offered by TransUnion

== See also ==
- Noodle (disambiguation)
