= Investment certificate =

In the U.S. an investment product designed to offer guaranteed interest

This article is specific to the United States.

An investment certificate is an investment product offered by an investment company or brokerage firm in the United States designed to offer a competitive yield to an investor with the added safety of their principal.

A certificate allows the investor to make an investment and to earn a guaranteed interest rate for a predetermined amount of time. The product rules and specifics can vary depending on the company selling the certificates.

== History ==
The investment certificate was first introduced to the public in 1894 by John Elliott Tappan, the founder of the erstwhile Investor's Syndicate, today known as Ameriprise Financial. Investor's Syndicate marketed the product as a Face Amount Certificate. It allowed the investor to deposit a selected sum of money into the certificate and in turn the investor would receive a guaranteed interest rate after a predetermined amount of time. After the selected length of time had passed, or at maturity the principal and interest were returned to the investor.

== Product terms ==
Depending on the financial institution, certificates can offer various term options. Some certificates can be very liquid allowing for frequent deposits and/or withdrawals without penalty. Other certificates may more closely match the typical rules of a certificate of deposit, allowing the investor to select a term length (typically between 3 months to 3 years) and earn a guaranteed interest rate. These certificates are flexible and allow add-on payments during the term or withdrawals up to a specified amount without a charge. There are also certificate products that feature an interest rate tied to the stock market, namely the S&P 500 index. While each certificate product has its own rules they all have one common factor, security of the investor's principal.

== Difference between an investment certificate and CD ==
A certificate is an investment product, unlike a certificate of deposit (CD) offered by a banking institution. Being an investment product, it is not insured by the federal government or the Federal Deposit Insurance Corporation. Surrenders from a certificate, unlike a CD, must be reported to the Internal Revenue Service on the individual investor's tax returns. These surrenders would be shown on a 1099-R form for retirement accounts or a 1099-B for non-retirement accounts. Certificates also typically have lower surrender charges if the money is withdrawn early compared to CDs and feature a longer grace period between terms (generally between 14 and 16 days). (See: Certificate of deposit.)
