= John Elliott Tappan =

American lawyer and financial innovator

- Born: August 29, 1870; Oshkosh, Wisconsin, U.S.
- Died: January 16, 1957 (aged 86); Warwick, Rhode Island, U.S.
- Resting place: Lakewood Cemetery
- Occupations: Lawyer and businessman
- Known for: Inventing the investment certificate
- Spouse: Winifred Gallagher Tappan
- Children: 5

John Elliott Tappan (August 29, 1870 - January 16, 1957) was an American lawyer and businessman from Minneapolis, Minnesota. Tappan founded Investors Syndicate in 1894, an investment company which later became Investors Diversified Services (IDS), then American Express Financial Advisors, and is known today as Ameriprise Financial and RiverSource.

Tappan is credited with inventing the investment certificate, and making the first certificate available to the public when he founded the Investors Syndicate.

== Early life ==
John Elliot Tappan was born on August 29, 1870, to Elliott Smith Tappan and Adelaide (Goodrich) Tappan in Oshkosh, Wisconsin. Tappan's father's family had lived in Kingston, New York since the 1630s. He was a direct descendant of the politician and American Revolutionary War patriot Maj. Christopher Tappen. His father was the first cousin of Henry Philip Tappan. Adelaide Goodrich Tappan was also descended from a prominent family who had lived in Wethersfield, Connecticut since the 1650s. By 1851, both family's fortunes had waned, and Elliott and Adelaide Tappan migrated to Oshkosh to homestead a 90-acre farm there. Elliott Tappan died in 1873, aged only 42, leaving Adelaide to manage the farm alone with their three children, including the 2-year-old John. Adelaide Tappan put the farm up for sale in 1875 and first moved to Janesville, and then in 1879 to the then-booming frontier city of Minneapolis. John Tappan, as the youngest child in a single-parent household, quickly became independent. He attended school and held several jobs as a boy, delivering newspapers and working as a shoe store clerk.

Tappan's self-reliance transformed into teenage rebellion. In retaliation to her brother's sometimes cruel pranks, One night in the Spring of 1887 John's sister Carrie put camphor in his food one night. As soon as he recovered, he took the little money he'd saved and left home, hopping freight trains to California. After a year of exploring California, Tappan contracted tuberculosis. His physician recommended the more temperate Washington Territory, and Tappan moved to Seattle in the summer of 1888. While recuperating, he enrolled in the preparatory department of the University of Washington Territory, and completed his high school degree. In June 1889, Tappan took a job as a lumberjack in the Washington wilderness, and then became an Indian agent in South Dakota. He returned home to Minnesota in 1890, and in 1892 he worked as stenographer in Duluth with the Merritt Brothers, developers of iron ore deposits of the Mesabi Range. In 1893 Tappan enrolled at the University of Minnesota's night law school.

== Investors Syndicate ==
Tappan believed that he could help reconcile the differences dividing the Western agricultural, logging and mining states and Wall Street, and promote financial independence for ordinary citizens. Tappan later recounted, “I conceived of the idea of a thrift plan upon a conservative honest basis, that would appeal to people as a means of investing small amounts with the safety and yield that was secured by larger investors.”. His attitudes were in stark contrast to those of his wealthy New York relations, such as his second cousin, the banker Frederick D. Tappen.

In 1894, Tappan and local Minneapolis attorney Henry Farnham submitted articles of incorporation for a new firm, Investors Syndicate. After receiving approval from the state commissioner of insurance, the company was organized under the general incorporation statute of Minnesota in July 1894 with $50,000 in capital. As expressed in its charter, its purpose was extremely broad. Investors Syndicate was authorized to deal in government and corporate bonds, stocks, mortgages notes, and all kinds of personal property, to buy and sell such instruments for other persons, and to issue its own notes and obligations of debt. Tappan also conceived of a new investment certificate, which he called a “face amount certificate.” Tappan's certificates paid around 6 percent, which was several points above what banks could offer and well above the 2 percent on government bonds of 3 percent on railroad bonds. The higher yield made them attractive to investors who were looking to increase the earning power of their savings without taking the risks of corporate stocks. “Its object,” Tappan wrote, “is to encourage frugality and to assist and encourage its patrons in saving systematically small sums monthly.”

In November, 1896 Tappan married Winifred Gallagher, a secretary and Irish immigrant from Tubbercurry, County Sligo. That January Tappan graduated from the University of Minnesota College of Law. Winnie typed company letters and running the office of the Investors Syndicate, and soon became an integral part of the Investors Syndicate's team. By the end of that year, Investors Syndicate had assets of $2,500 and a handful of subscribers. Tappan truly believed that he had developed a revolutionary financial product and he set out to prove it, despite several setbacks. Despite several Minnesota banks going under, the predicted upsurge in orders for face-amount certificates did not materialize. Then the company's president, George McDonald, was jailed for “swindling” after being convicted of selling bonds by making false claims. Tappan learned through the high-profile investigations of insurance companies in 1905 that investments had to be kept separate from gambling and speculation. Though the investment certificate did not have a gambling feature, in January 1897 the postmaster general of Washington State accused Investors Syndicate and Tappan of “being engaged in a lottery for the distribution of money”. Tappan scrambled to prove the validity of his investment certificates, but the company was eventually accused of fraud and lost its mailing privileges. Tappan was furious, and after various appeals to the Postmaster General and Justice Department went unanswered, Tappan and Farnham managed to successfully appeal to their congressman and have their mailing privileges restored. In September 1897, Tappan was able to satisfy the Post Office by agreeing that Investors Syndicate would be allowed to pay out all the old business on the books, but not write any new business except under a modified contract. By the end of 1899, Investors Syndicate had written over 300 contracts, done $100,000 in business, and paid out over $11,000 in returns to its early investors.

In 1901, the U.S. Post Office curtailed the company's mailing privileges once again. Tappan immediately set out for Washington, D.C. He believed that the Post Office attorney was in effect extorting business out of investment companies with the help of postal inspectors. Tappan eventually left Washington with just one charge against the company, following a full investigation. Tappan had modified the method of maturity in his contracts, so that coupons of the same contact matured in different months. The investigators ruled that such a feature bordered on the “multiple” system, whereby an element of chance was added to the investment. In reality, the feature existed to make the certificates more attractive by speeding up the time when the investor saw his or her return, but the postal investigators found it to be gambling. Investors Syndicate escaped the “scandal” largely unscathed. The Minneapolis Journal reported on the story, and the successful resolution of the problem only served to reinforce their conviction that the “face amount certificate” was legitimate and legal.

Later that year Tappan filed a claim and established homestead rights in the burgeoning hamlet of Angora, forty miles north of Duluth. He and Winnie built farm buildings, planted crops and raised Angora goats, and established the township of Angora with their farmer neighbors, many of whom were new immigrants from Finland. His work on the farm showed him the clear struggles facing American farmers and their precarious financial situations.

Back in Minneapolis, Investors Syndicate began to expand outside of their personal and professional networks and expand their portfolio. This effort was curtailed when a $10,000 loan to the National Securities Company, had to be written off when the company went bankrupt. Then J.W. Earl, who since 1900 had run the agency system that marketed the “face amount certificates”, died in December 1910. The Investors Syndicate's future looked bleak. In 1913, help arrived for Tappan, in the form of John Salmon Hibbert, who took the position of General Sales Agent. Hibbert established a geographically extensive agency and built on Tappan's already prominent insurance template for sales. The syndicate began to bloom beyond expectations, and three years after Hibbert's appointment, the company had become one of the largest and most successful investment companies in Minnesota. By 1921, the company would hold over $3 million in insurance policies. In February 1914, Hibbert was elected vice president and general manager of Investors Syndicate. The company was getting so big, that by December 1914, Tappan owned less stock in Investors Syndicate than did others. Tappan only began to draw a salary from his work at Investors Syndicate in 1915. Prior to that he'd invested his salary and profits back into the firm. By 1917, Investors Syndicate had assets of nearly $1 million. Tappan's law firm was also thriving, enhanced by his nephew Thomas F. Gallagher, later a Justice of the Minnesota Supreme Court and gubernatorial candidate. In 1925, Tappan took his family on a six-month Grand Tour of Europe and the Middle East. Four months into the trip, Tappan was blindsided when his associates John Hibbert and A. W. King sent him a telegram announcing that they were selling their shares in Investors Syndicate. Tappan rushed back to Minneapolis. Even though he felt that he had been back-stabbed by his co-workers, Tappan finally decided to join them and sell the company. He later said that selling the company felt like losing a child.

== Personal life and death ==
Tappan married Winnie. They had five children, Ruth W. (later Mrs. Joseph L. Dowling), Marion (later Mrs. Vincent Ryan), John Elliott Jr., Zita, and Charles H. Zita died of scarlet fever in 1908.

Tappan died on January 16, 1957, in Warwick, Rhode Island. He was buried in Lakewood Cemetery.
