= Canada Soccer drone spying scandal =

Use of drones to spy on competing national teams

In June and July 2024, staff from the Canadian Soccer Association were discovered to be using drone surveillance to spy or attempt to spy on the training sessions of opponents. The initial incident at the 2024 Copa América was not initially reported on or disclosed at the time. The second incident at the 2024 Paris Olympics drew global attention. After the Paris incident, formal investigations by the Canadian Soccer Association and FIFA began and the latter resulted in a six-point deduction for the women's national team at the 2024 Summer Olympics.

== Discovery ==
=== 2024 Olympics drone incident ===
The Canada women's soccer team was drawn alongside New Zealand in Group A of the 2024 Olympic women's soccer tournament. The two teams played each other as their first match, on 25 July at Stade Geoffroy-Guichard in Saint-Étienne.

Ahead of the tournament, on 22 July, New Zealand players noticed a drone flying over their training session and reported this to local police. Drone operating laws in France ban drones from being flown above people and ban recordings made by drones to be shared without the subjects' consent. French police were already wary of drones in terms of security around the 2024 Summer Olympics. Saint-Étienne police followed the drone and found and detained its operator, a member of the staff of the Canadian team. The New Zealand Olympic Committee (NZOC) then reported the incident to the International Olympic Committee (IOC) integrity unit, before making a public announcement the next day together with New Zealand Football, expressing their disappointment towards the Canadian team. The Canadian Olympic Committee (COC) then apologized to the NZOC and said they would review next steps with Canada Soccer and all the relevant governing bodies.

The drone operator, analyst Joseph Lombardi, admitted after his arrest that he had also filmed another New Zealand training session on 19 July, a fact later made public by the COC. Though Lombardi immediately said that the spying was "a personal initiative", the police found a text message exchange on his phone with assistant coach Jasmine Mander that indicated Mander knew of the spying.

==== Immediate consequences ====
Canada Soccer made a decision that Lombardi, Mander, and later head coach Bev Priestman should be suspended and all were sent home from the Olympics: Lombardi and Mander before any matches and Priestman after having sat out the opening match against New Zealand. Assistant coach Andy Spence took temporary charge of the first game, before being installed as coach when Priestman was sent home. Priestman denies being part of a spying scheme. On 24 July, Lombardi was given an eight-month suspended prison sentence by the Saint-Étienne prosecutor under a French law that allows for suspects to enter a plea bargain with prosecutors after being held for 48 hours, if a deal is agreed by prosecutors and lawyers. Lombardi resigned from Canada Soccer. The COC offered legal support to both Lombardi and Mander, as well as saying mental health support was available to the whole delegation.

The COC reported that New Zealand had asked FIFA to not award points to Canada for the 25 July match. New Zealand Football said that they had sought "urgent action" from the FIFA Disciplinary Committee. On 27 July, FIFA announced that it had deducted six points from Canada in the tournament, fined Canada Soccer 200,000 Swiss francs, and banned Priestman, Lombardi, and Mander from all soccer for one year. On 29 July, the COC appealed the decision. On 31 July, the Court of Arbitration for Sport dismissed the appeal.

=== 2024 Copa America drone incident ===
The 2024 Copa América drone incident refers to an episode during the 2024 Copa América tournament in which a staff member with the Canada men's national team operated a drone during a closed training session held by the Chilean national team, who it would face in the coming days. The incident occurred while the Canada men's national team was based in Orlando, Florida, and was investigated through CONMEBOL's disciplinary process.

Following adjudication, CONMEBOL revoked the accreditation of the staff member involved and issued a fine to Canada Soccer.

The 2024 Copa América was hosted in the United States, with participating teams based in multiple cities throughout the tournament. National teams routinely conduct closed training sessions at secured facilities, with access restricted to accredited personnel.

The Canada men's national team was stationed in Orlando, Florida for a portion of the competition and trained at the ESPN Wide World of Sports Complex.

==== The incident ====
According to documentation from CONMEBOL’s disciplinary process, a member of Canada Soccer’s staff operated a drone over the ESPN Wide World of Sports Complex while another national team was conducting a closed training session.

CONMEBOL documentation stated that the drone was detected by drone detection software used at the complex. An official from the ESPN Wide World of Sports Complex required that the drone be brought down.

Submissions made by the Canada men’s national team during the CONMEBOL disciplinary process argued that the staff member was filming an empty pitch, not an active training session. According to Canada Soccer’s explanation, the footage was intended for motivational and promotional video purposes, and the organization denied that the staff member had inappropriately filmed a closed training session.

The matter was adjudicated by CONMEBOL during the Copa América tournament. Following its review of the incident and the submissions provided, CONMEBOL imposed disciplinary measures for a violation of Articles 11.1 and 11.2 of the CONMEBOL Disciplinary Code related to integrity, loyalty, and sportsmanship and prohibits conduct that discredits football or seeks to obtain an improper sporting advantage.

=== Timeline and public disclosure ===
The incident occurred weeks before a separate, unrelated drone incident in Paris that later attracted widespread international media attention. The Copa América incident was handled through CONMEBOL’s internal disciplinary process at the time and received limited public attention.

== Investigations ==
Relating to the 2024 Olympics incident, FIFA began investigating Priestman and Canada Soccer as well as "all potentially involved parties" on 24 July. Canada Soccer also opened their own investigation on the same day, which they said would also "seek to understand the historical culture of competitive ethics within all of our programs". Canada Soccer and the COC confirmed on 26 July that there had been a history of spying within their teams, and that they would have an independent external review. Priestman was suspended until Canada Soccer's external investigation was completed in November 2024.

In July 2024, the Board of Directors of Canada Soccer Association commissioned an independent external investigation into the use of drone technology by members of Canada Soccer's national team coaching staff. The investigation was prompted by incidents at the 2024 Paris Olympic Games, where a drone was used to film training sessions of the New Zealand women's national team on July 20 and July 22, 2024.

The investigation was conducted by Sonia Regenbogen of the Canadian law firm Mathews, Dinsdale & Clark LLP. Its mandate was to determine whether the drone use at the Paris Games was approved, directed, or condoned by members of the Women's National Team coaching staff, and to assess whether similar practices of surreptitious surveillance had occurred at prior international tournaments involving the women's or men's national teams. The investigation also examined whether senior leadership at Canada Soccer had prior knowledge of, or condoned, such practices.

As part of the process, the investigator conducted interviews, reviewed documentary and electronic evidence, and considered disciplinary materials from FIFA and CONMEBOL. Individuals who participated in the investigation were required to speak without anonymity to the investigator and to maintain confidentiality during the review. Canada Soccer stated that participants were assured their identities would not be publicly disclosed, in keeping with privacy obligations and human resources considerations.

The investigator concluded, on a balance of probabilities, that a member of the Women's National Team coaching staff operated a drone over restricted airspace at the Paris Olympics to surreptitiously film an opponent's training sessions, and that this conduct was approved and directed by senior members of the coaching staff. The report further found that similar practices had occurred at certain tournaments between June 2022 and March 2024, under Bev Priestman's leadership. By contrast, the investigation determined, on a balance of probabilities. that a separate drone incident involving the Men's National Team at the 2024 Copa América involved filming an empty stadium for promotional purposes and did not constitute surreptitious surveillance of an opponent, despite the findings by CONMEBOL. The investigation did not report any wrongdoing by former head coach John Herdman.

Canada Soccer released a redacted summary of the investigation's findings to the public in November 2024, stating that the redactions were intended to balance transparency with legal and ethical obligations related to confidentiality and privacy.

Mander and Priestman remained on Canada Soccer's payroll until 2025, when negotiated settlements were reached. On 23 September 2025, it was announced by Canada Soccer that a total of 14 coaches and administrative staff had been subject to disciplinary measures as a result of the drone scandal and "the underlying cultural patterns that created the issue". Canada Soccer did not release the names of findings against these individuals citing privacy reasons.

In 2025, Mander wrote a first person essay for the Player's Tribune that apologized to fans, described the online harassment she had received, and expressed dissatisfaction with the redaction and publication of the investigation summary, stating that it did not fully reflect the broader organizational culture and oversight issues that she believed contributed to the incident.
