= Wonderbly =

English custom publishing company

- Company type: Public
- Industry: Publishing
- Founded: 2012 in England
- Headquarters: London, England
- Parent: Penguin Random House
- Website: www.wonderbly.com

Wonderbly, previously Lost My Name, is a technology and publishing business that produces personalized books for children and adults. Launched in 2012, Wonderbly has sold over 8 million books in 169 countries and territories, and their titles are available in 11 languages. The company's headquarters are in Bloomsbury, London. As of June 2025, Wonderbly is owned by Penguin Random House, a subsidiary of the German media conglomerate Bertelsmann.

== History ==
Wonderbly was founded by Asi Sharabi, former advertising exec; The company is currently headquartered in East London.

In June 2015, Wonderbly announced a $9 million Series A round, led by Google Ventures, and in July 2017, another $8.5 million Series B round led by Ravensburger. The company also underwent a rebrand from Lost My Name to Wonderbly in the same month.

In July 2021, private equity firm Graphite Capital acquired Wonderbly.

On 4 June 2025, it was announced that Penguin Random House had acquired Wonderbly.

== Products ==
The initial product published by Wonderbly, The Little Boy/Girl Who Lost His/Her Name, is a personalised picture book for readers whose age ranges between two and six years old. The book tells of a child who has lost their name and goes on an adventure to find it. Each book comprises a selection of mini stories, each of which feature the letters of the child's missing name.

The Little Boy/Girl Who Lost His/Her Name has been translated into British English, American English, German, French, Spanish, Italian, Dutch, Chinese and Japanese.

Wonderbly followed this up with The Incredible Intergalactic Journey Home, a picture book personalised around a child's address that featured a satellite image of their real home.

Wonderbly's third title, Kingdom of You, is a personalised picture book based on a child's favourite things.

Most recently Wonderbly released The Birthday Thief, which uses a child's birthdate as its narrative structure.

== Recognition ==
The company won recognition in Series 12 of BBC's Dragon's Den, where two of the co-founders appeared on British and Australian television to secure a record breaking investment.

== Awards ==
=== 2014 ===
- Best Start Up, FutureBook Innovation Awards
- Startups Award, People's Champion
- Silver winner for Best Children's Story 3 to 5 Years (The Little Boy/Girl Who Lost His/Her Name), Loved by Parents
- Bronze winner for Best Children's Story Preschool (The Little Boy/Girl Who Lost His/Her Name), Loved by Parents

=== 2015 ===
- Winner of the Self Published Books category, British Book Design and Production Awards
- Shortlisted for Digital Business of the Year, Bookseller Industry Awards

=== 2016 ===
- Future Fifty, Tech City UK
- The Top 50 Innovative Companies in the United Kingdom, Innovative Business Awards
- Gold winner for Innovative Book of the Year (The Incredible Intergalactic Journey Home), Junior Design Awards
- The Leap 100, City AM
- Top 10 Most Innovative Companies in Media, Fast Company
- Most Innovative Companies For Parents & Kids, Fatherly
- One to Watch, Sunday Times Tech Track 100
- Shortlisted for Best E-Commerce Startup, The Europas Conference & Awards
- BAFTA nominee for the Original Interactive category (Blinkies), BAFTA

=== 2017 ===
- Silver winner for Best designed/illustrated book for children (Kingdom of You), Junior Design Awards
- Rank #1, Sunday Times Tech Track 100
