= Darren Shapland =

British businessman (born 1966)

- Born: Darren Mark Shapland; November 1966 (age 59)
- Spouse: Wendy Sarah Shapland

Darren Mark Shapland (born November 1966) is a British businessman notable for executive positions at major retailers in the United Kingdom.

== Biography ==
Early in his career, Shapland held positions at Superdrug and Burton Group.

Between 2005 and 2010, Shapland was CFO of Sainsbury's.

In 2012, he was named CEO of Carpetright with an annual salary of £450,000. In October 2013, Shapland resigned after the company reported an earnings miss.

In August 2014, he was appointed chairman of Maplin Electronics and Moo.com.

He also served as the chairman of Poundland from 2014 to 2016.

In February 2015, he was named chairman of Topps Tiles.

In April 2023, he was named to the board of directors of JD Sports Fashion. At that time, he faced an attempt by an activist investor to oust him as chairman of Topps Tiles.

== Personal life ==
He is married to Wendy Sarah Shapland.
