= Nourdine Bihmane =

- Born: 1977 (age 48–49); Oulad Mtaa, Marrakesh-Safi, Morocco
- Education: Pierre and Marie Curie University; Princeton University; INSEAD
- Occupation: Business executive
- Years active: 2002–present
- Known for: Former CEO of Atos
- Title: CEO of Konecta
- Term: April 2024–present

Nourdine Bihmane (born 1977) is a Moroccan-French business executive who has served as the chief executive officer (CEO) of Konecta since April 2024. Previously, he served as the CEO of Atos from 2022 until 2023.

== Early life and education ==
Bihmane was born in Oulad Mtaa, a small town in the Marrakesh-Safi region of Morocco. The family relocated to Lyon, France when Bihmane was four years old.

After completing secondary school, Bihmane enrolled at the Pierre and Marie Curie University (UPMC) in Paris, where he received a degree in engineering. He later received degrees from Princeton University and INSEAD.

== Career ==
Bihmane joined Atos in 2002 after graduating from UPMC. In 2009, he became Head of Managed Services for Atos in Iberia. He later relocated to Princeton, New Jersey, where he was appointed Head of Operations for Atos North America.

Following the 2014 acquisition of Xerox’s IT Outsourcing business by Atos, Bihmane led the integration of Xerox ITO into the Atos Group.

In 2017, Bihmane returned to Europe and joined the executive committee. He was named Head of Business & Platform Solutions for Atos in 2019. In 2020, he also assumed leadership of the Atos Growing Markets division.

In June 2022, following the resignation of Rodolphe Belmer, Bihmane was named group CEO of Atos. In this role, he and fellow Deputy CEO Philippe Oliva led efforts to separate the Atos Group into two companies. Bihmane served as Group CEO until October 2023, when he was succeeded by Yves Bernaert. He remained Deputy CEO of Tech Foundations until March 2024.

Following his departure from Atos, Bihmane was appointed as CEO of Konecta on April 15, 2024. He launched the three-year transformation plan Katalyst on January 25 and engaged in the shift of the company to digital and AI with some partnerships with companies such as Google, Uniphore,

Bihmane also serves as president of Les Entretiens de l'Excellence, a French association addressing inequality in France's education system. He is a member of the International Red Cross and Red Crescent Movement.

In 2026, Bihmane published Rester Humain: L'entreprise à l'épreuve de l'IA, a book about the effects of artificial intelligence on organizations and the labor market. The book introduces the concept of "algorithmic humanism" and outlines AI governance proposals focused on transparency, dignity, and technological sovereignty.
