= Axalta =

Coatings company headquartered in Philadelphia

Axalta Coating Systems Ltd.
- Type: Public company
- Traded as: NYSE: AXTA; S&P 400 component
- Industry: Coatings
- Founded: 1866; 160 years ago
- Headquarters: Philadelphia, Pennsylvania, USA (headquarters); Bermuda (legal domicile)
- Area served: Worldwide
- Key people: Chris Villavarayan (CEO)
- Brands: Abcite, Alesta, AquaEC, Cromax, Imron, Spies Hecker, Standox, Voltatex, Chemspec
- Revenue: ▲US$4.8 billion (2017)
- Number of employees: 12,650
- Website: www.axalta.com

Axalta Coating Systems Ltd., also known as simply Axalta, is an American company specializing in coatings in a wide variety of industrial applications, materials and sectors, including automotive paints. The company is based in Philadelphia, Pennsylvania, and incorporated in Bermuda. Axalta develops and manufactures coatings for light and commercial vehicles, industrial, and refinish applications. The firm does business in 130 countries, has nearly 13,000 employees, and has more than 100,000 customers.

Axalta traces its origins to the German firm Herberts Gmbh, which began in 1866 coating carriages before moving to automotive painting. Through later mergers the company became DuPont Performance Coatings (DPC), part of the American DuPont chemical empire, and was rebranded as Axalta Coating Systems after being purchased by The Carlyle Group in 2013. Axalta went public on the New York Stock Exchange in November 2014 and since then has become fully independent. Carlyle Group exited their last ownership stake in Axalta in 2015.

The company was the sponsor of four-time NASCAR champion Jeff Gordon and the No. 24 Hendrick Motorsports car, a relationship which dated back to Gordon's first NASCAR Cup Series race in 1992. Axalta currently sponsors William Byron in the No. 24 car.

== History ==
The firm's first products were developed in Germany in 1866 to protect carriages from the gravel of dirt roads. In 1920, the company created a quick-drying, multi-color lacquer line for automotive painting. Operating as Herberts Gmbh, the company grew under Kurt Herberts, introducing the popular automobile finish Standox in 1955.

In 1999 Herberts merged with DuPont Automotive Finishes, a transport coating systems technology company that started in 1922 in Wilmington, Delaware, to form DPC. In 2012, the private equity firm The Carlyle Group announced its plans to purchase and discontinue DPC. The Carlyle Group completed the sale in February 2013 and founded Axalta. On November 12, 2014, the firm completed its IPO on the New York Stock Exchange (NYSE: AXTA).

On January 21, 2015, Axalta and Chinese industrial coatings firm Shanghai Kinlita Chemical formed a partnership to operate in China. In April 2015, Berkshire Hathaway invested $560 million in Axalta Coating Systems. In July 2016, the firm acquired United Paint and Chemical Corp.'s automotive interior coatings business.

The company currently operates in North America, South America, Asia, Europe, the Middle East, and Africa. The activities for Europe, the Middle East, and Africa region (EMEA) are based in Basel, Switzerland. On November 7, 2018, the company held its grand opening of its new research and development center located at the Philadelphia Naval Shipyard known as the Global Innovation Center. Axalta's Global Innovation Center is the largest coatings research and development (R&D) center in the world.

In 1953 Axalta predecessor DuPont published the first annual Color Popularity Report, the first in the industry to have extensive global data in one report. The firm developed L,a,b color equations, an important component of modern color science. It introduced the first waterborne electrical steel coating in the industry in the 1960s.

In October 2017, AkzoNobel approached competitor Axalta Coating Systems over a potential combination. Nippon Paint Holdings Co. attempted to buy the company in November 2017, but the deal failed to reach an agreement.

In July 2021, Axalta acquired U-POL, a Northamptonshire based manufacturer and distributor of fillers, coatings and aerosols, from Graphite Capital.

On August 17, 2021 Berkshire Hathaway sold its entire stake in Axalta Coating Systems.

In November 2025 it was announced that Axalta would merge with AkzoNobel. In August 2026, shareholders for both Axalta and AkzoNobel approved the companies’ proposed all-stock merger. Completion remains subject to regulatory approvals, with closing expected in late 2026 or early 2027.

== Products ==
Among Axalta's oldest products are Standox and Spies Hecker. Cromax, a water-based product, and the industrial paints Nap-Gard, a powder coating for oil and gas pipeline companies, and Voltatex for electrical insulation, were introduced in the 1990s. Other products made by Axalta include Abcite thermoplastic powder coatings, Alesta thermoplastic and thermosetting powder coatings, AquaEC water based electrocoating, Audurra abrasives and tools for vehicle bodywork in Australia, Europe and Korea, Centari three component Acrylic Enamel topcoat, Challenger affordable compact refinishing system for bodyshops, Harmonized Coating Technologies light vehicle OEM coatings, Imron for industrial vehicle application, and Nason finishing system for time and budget limited automotive refinishers.

== Motorsports ==
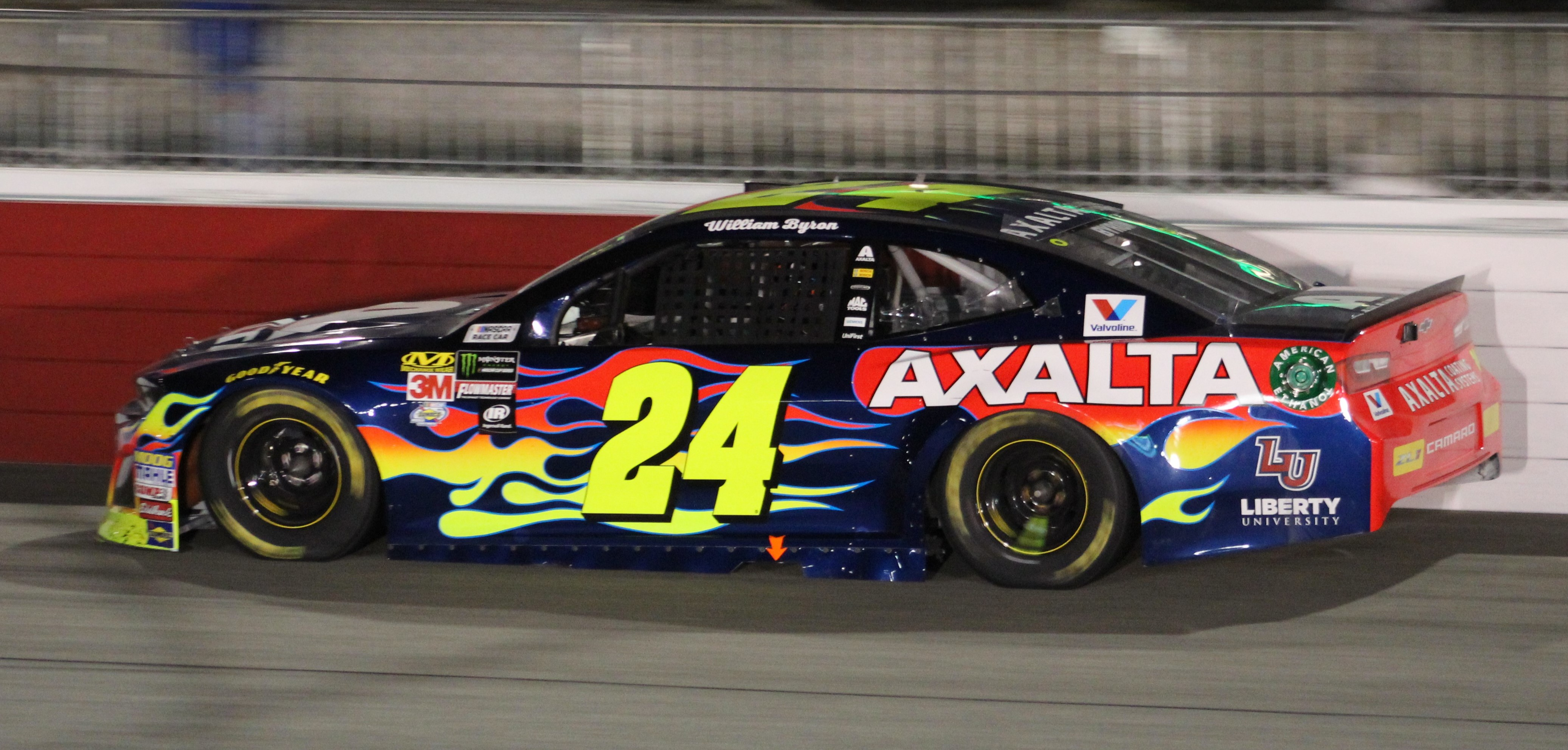
William Byron's Axalta-sponsored car at Richmond Raceway in 2018

Axalta currently sponsors the No. 24 Camaro of William Byron. Previously, the company sponsored four-time series champion Jeff Gordon's No. 24 car, a relationship which dated back to Axalta's days as DuPont and Gordon's first Cup race in 1992. At the time of his retirement following the 2015 NASCAR Sprint Cup Series, Gordon won three times in an Axalta-sponsored car, all of which came in 2014. During Gordon's career, he ran variations of his Axalta scheme to promote its brands such as Cromax and Standox. On February 12, 2015, Gordon was hired by Axalta as a global business advisor. Following Gordon's retirement, Axalta's sponsorship was moved to Hendrick Motorsports' #88 car, driven by Dale Earnhardt Jr.. Additionally, Gordon and Alex Bowman filled in for Earnhardt in the later part of the 2016 season when he was sidelined with concussion symptoms, and stayed with the car with Bowman driving when Earnhardt retired following 2017 before consolidating its efforts on Byron's #24 car in 2018.

In 2014, Axalta sponsored Regan Smith's JR Motorsports Camaro for the Axalta Faster. Tougher. Brighter. 200 at Phoenix International Raceway; the company has been a partner of the team since 2008.

Axalta provided paint for the entire Hendrick team, along with three other NASCAR teams: Kyle Busch Motorsports of the NASCAR Craftsman Truck Series, JR Motorsports, and Stewart–Haas Racing of the Cup Series. However, with the introduction of the Next Gen car in 2022, NASCAR has mandated that all NASCAR Cup Series cars must be wrapped in vinyl to aid in pre- and post-race inspections. IndyCar Series team Sarah Fisher Hartman Racing also received paint from Axalta. In addition to sponsoring Gordon, Axalta sponsored the June Cup Series race at Pocono Raceway, known as the Axalta "We Paint Winners" 400 (now known as the Pocono 400) and the March Xfinity Series race at Phoenix International Raceway, called the Axalta Faster. Tougher. Brighter. 200 until 2017, when DC Solar replaced it as sponsor.

Axalta also sponsors snocross team Judnick Motorsport/Polaris Racing, who field riders Ross Martin and James Johnstad in the AMSOIL Championship Snocross series. The sponsorship lasts through 2017.

In 2015, Axalta became the title sponsor of the C2 Team, which competes in Stock Car Brasil. The team currently fields cars for Júlio Campos and Gabriel Casagrande.

Through its Spies Hecker brand, Axalta provides paint for Formula One team Mercedes AMG F1. Mercedes team principal Toto Wolff stated the lightness of the paint allows the team's Silver Arrows cars to drop in weight, assisting in performance.
