= Maplin (retailer) =

British electronics retailer

Digital-First Retail Limited T/A Maplin Electronics
- Trade name: Maplin
- Type: Private limited company
- Industry: Online retail
- Founded: 22 June 1976; 9 June 2018 (online)
- Founders: (1976) Roger Allen; Sandra Allen; Doug Simmons
- Headquarters: 1976–2018: Marlow, United Kingdom; From 2018: High Wycombe, Buckinghamshire
- Area served: United Kingdom and Ireland
- Key people: Darren Shapland (Chairman) Graham Harris (CEO)
- Products: Electronics; Smart Home; Computing; Security; Batteries; Gaming; CCTV
- Website: www.maplin.co.uk

Maplin Electronics is the trading name of an online retailer of electronic goods in the United Kingdom and Ireland launched in 2019, using the brand of the former company Maplin Electronics Limited, which operated from 1972 to 2018.

The original Maplin company began life as a mail order supplier of electronic components focussed on the hobbyist market, something which would remain a significant core of the business for much of its life.

Within a few years, Maplin had opened a small number of shops. In later years, the number of shops expanded significantly- with 217 Maplin stores by June 2017- and there was an increasing focus on the more mainstream consumer electronics market.

On 28 February 2018, Maplin went into administration and all stores permanently ceased trading in June that year. Following this, the "Maplin" brand was sold and a new company using the name launched as an online-only operation in early 2019.

== History of original Maplin company ==
Former Maplin Electronics logo

=== Founding ===
Maplin Electronic Supplies was established in 1972 as a mail order business by Roger Allen, Sandra Allen and Doug Simmons. The company started in a bedroom at the Allens' home in Rayleigh, Essex, after the two electronics enthusiasts were disappointed by the complexity and poor availability of existing electronic component suppliers.

The trio placed an advertisement in an electronics magazine, after printing the company's first twenty eight page catalogue, which would be offered free to callers. Despite a slow start and dwindling profit in the first year, the company began to gain a reputation for first grade electronic components delivered exactly as shown in the catalogue by first class post.

==== First stores ====
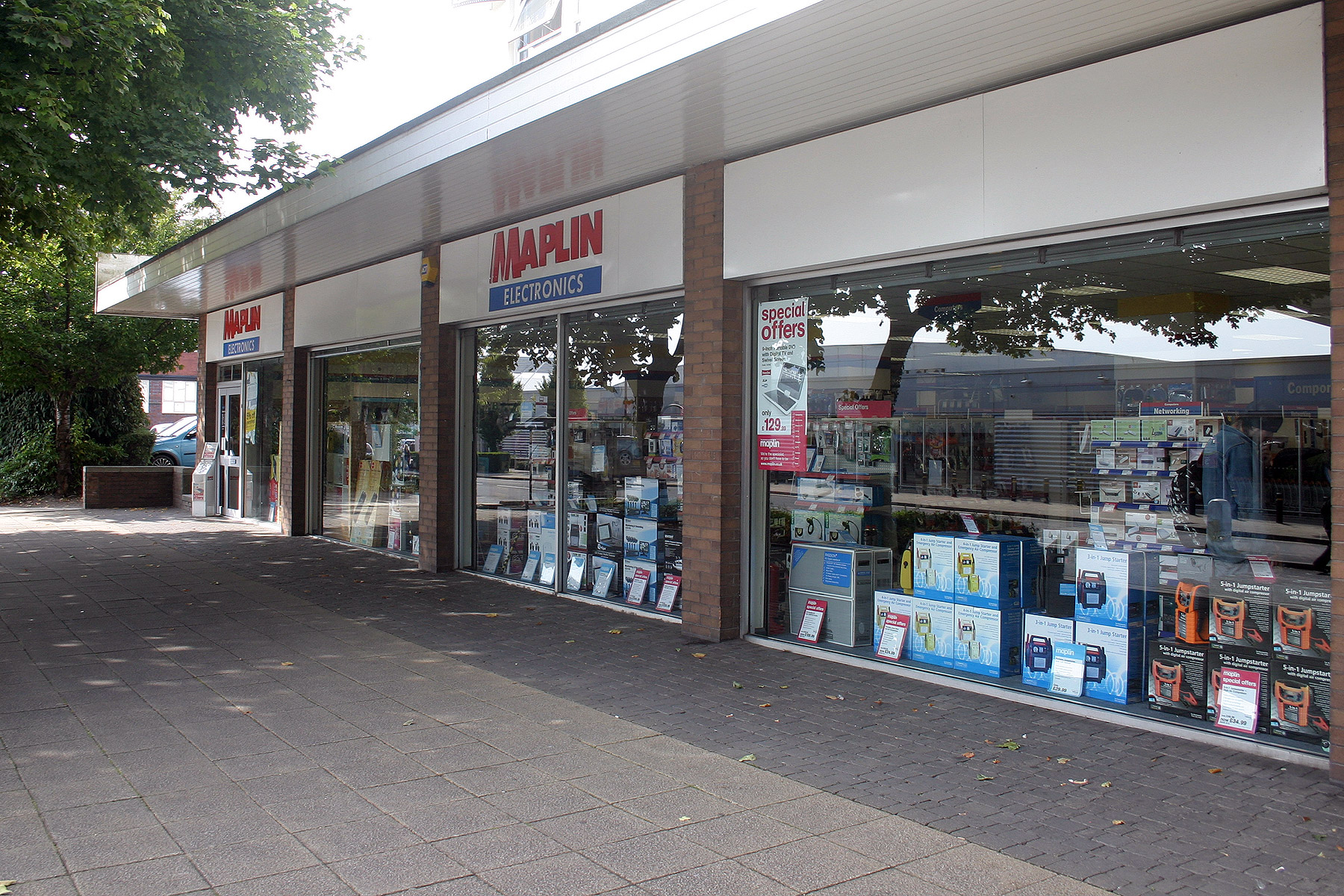
Maplin store in Stoke on Trent using the previous logo

The first store opened in 1976 in Westcliff-on-Sea and the mail order department moved into the rooms above the shop. Sales received a boost when Maplin was invited to take prime advertising space in IPC electronics magazines after the latter received complaints against some of their existing advertisers.

A second store opened in Hammersmith by the end of the year. The mail order side of the business had outgrown the space available above the store in Westcliff-on-Sea, and an ex dairy building in Hadleigh was purchased and established as Maplin's first warehouse.

Maplin had already started designing electronic kits for hobbyists and musicians, with several synthesiser and organ projects being published in the first magazine, Electronics & Music Maker, and subsequently made available as kits. After the second store opened Electronics – the Maplin Magazine was launched and initially published every quarter, then monthly as more projects were designed.

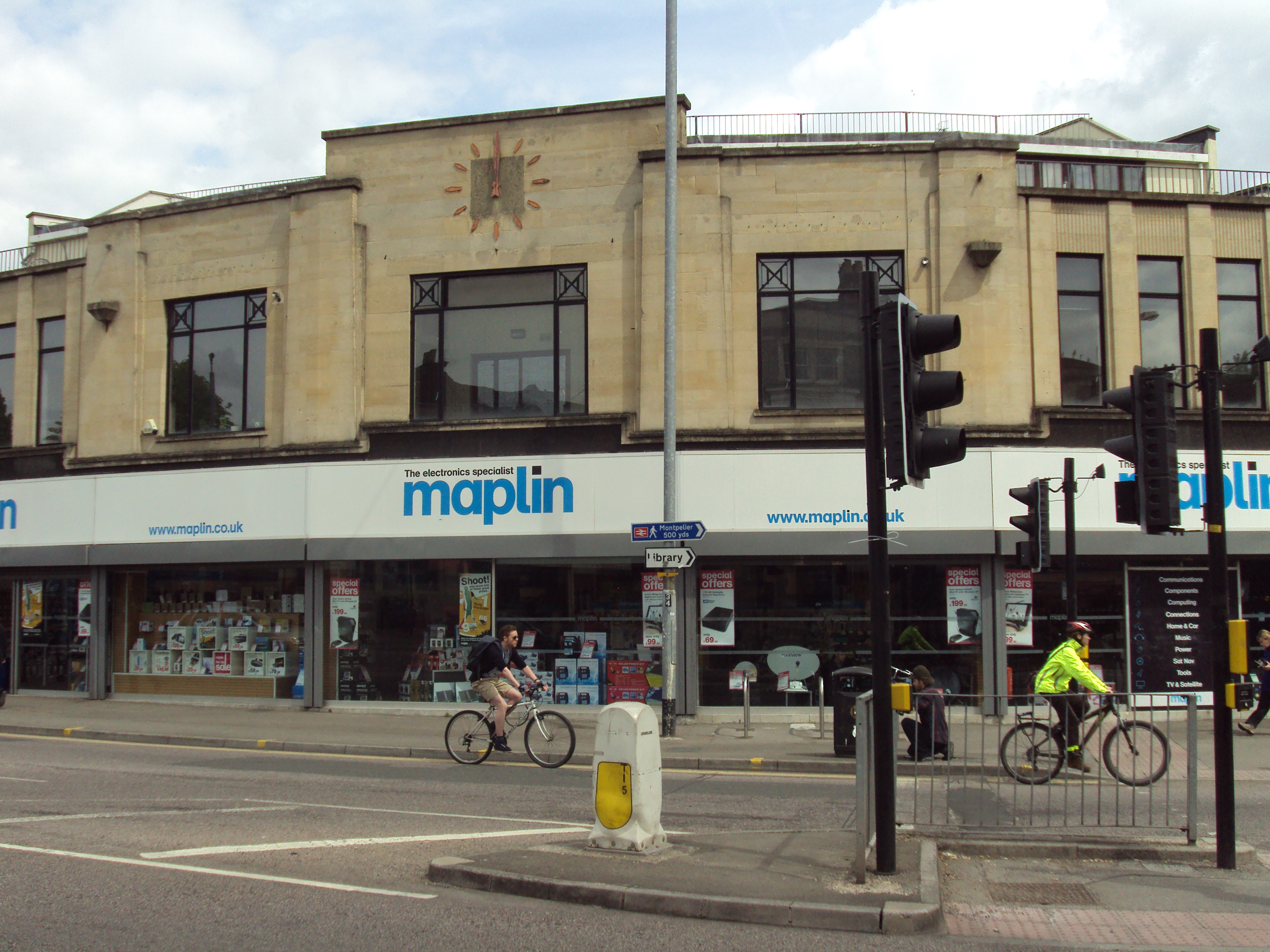
Maplin store in Gloucester Road, Bristol

The concurrent boom in home computer ownership in the beginning of the 1980s, spawned by manufacturers such as Sinclair, Commodore International and Atari, created opportunities for Maplin. They produced home build project kits such as speech synthesisers, memory expansion cards, extension keyboards, cables, and connectors to plug into these computers.

At the height of production of the home build kits Maplin's range was vast, with in house designed power amplifiers, radio kits, a weather station, and a full weather satellite receiving and display system and many others, as well as the Heathkit and Velleman ranges of kits. The catalogue, with its distinctive science fiction cover art by Rod Brown (in the style of Lionel Jeans), contained hundreds of application circuits and hundreds of thousands of copies were distributed each year.

=== Expansion ===
==== Move to South Yorkshire ====
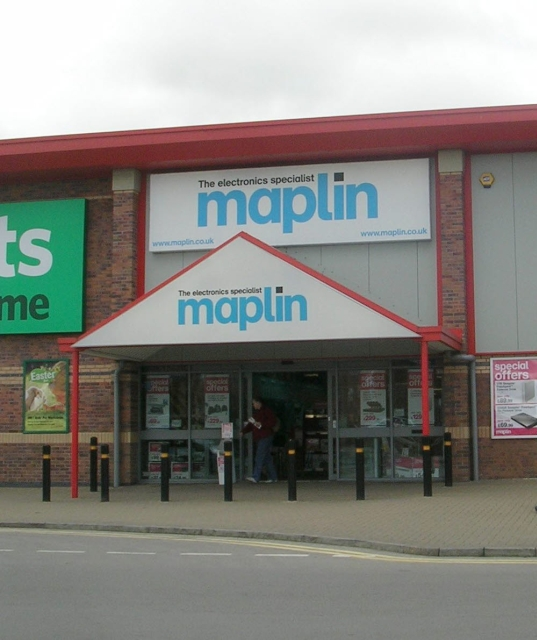
Maplin store in Westgate Retail Park, Wakefield

In 1985, Maplin Professional Supplies was created to serve the expanding business market with a catalogue of products selected specifically for professionals and the business market. In 1989, a new National Distribution Centre was opened at Wombwell, South Yorkshire, and four years later a Far Eastern headquarters was established in Taiwan.

By 1994, Maplin had a turnover of more than £29 million a year, and it was clear more help was needed to organise the business. In December 1994, Maplin was acquired by Saltire PLC.

In 1999, Maplin launched its own website, and the following year, sales from the site hit UK £1million. The Southend-on-Sea headquarters also closed in 2000, and all operations were moved to Wombwell. In June 2001, the company changed hands again, this time with a management buyout backed by Graphite Capital.

==== Far East Operations ====
Maplin Far East Operations was first established in 1992 when Maplin Electronics set up its first Far Eastern branch office in Taipei, Taiwan to strengthen buying power.

The office was in charge of product sourcing, purchasing, inspecting, shipping and payment arrangement from Taiwan and was known as the Far East Operations Centre. The Hong Kong Office followed in 1995 to handle the sourcing, purchasing and shipping from Hong Kong.

As most production in Taiwan and Hong Kong had moved to mainland China, the company registered a representative office in Shenzhen under the Hong Kong Office in 2004. The three offices in the Far East handled more than 500 suppliers and 5,000 buying items for the parent company.

The major product categories included cables, power supplies, electronics components, kits and tools, communication equipment, computers, toys, automotive electronics, and consumer electronics.

==== Acquisition by Saltire ====
In December 1994, the private equity firm Saltire plc acquired Maplin Electronics from its founders, with the intention of merging its operations with another electronics distribution business in its portfolio, Altai.

==== Acquisition by Graphite Capital ====
In June 2001, Graphite Capital led the £41 million management buy out of Maplin.

==== Acquisition by Montagu ====
In September 2004, Montagu Private Equity purchased 67% of Maplin from Graphite Capital at a cost of £244 million. In 2007, the company began to relocate its headquarters and distribution centre to a new facility at Brookfields Park, on the former Manvers Main Colliery, Rotherham, two miles from the old warehouse in Wombwell.

Maplin discontinued the processing of orders outside of the United Kingdom and Ireland in January 2010. Later in 2010, Montagu said they were evaluating their options with Maplin, because the value of their investment has been realised. It was envisaged that when the market conditions were right, Maplin would float on the London Stock Exchange.

==== Debt free ====
At the end of 2012, Maplin announced it was officially out of debt from its creditor Montagu Equity.

=== 2013 onwards ===
==== Drop ship vending ====
In June 2013, Maplin introduced drop ship vending, allowing them to offer a far greater range of stock for sale online than available in-store.

==== Horizon 2015 Project (2013 to 2015) ====
Chief Executive Officer John Cleland took post of Maplin on 1 March 2013. Following this, he set out plans for the project of Horizon 2015, aiming to recover the historic decline in the business by 2015.

The Horizon 2015 project established some medium term goals, such as a complete overhaul of the existing stores, widening the product range, and establishing a clear message to the consumer. Its success in stopping the decline and stabilising profitability helps secure its acquisition by Rutland Partners in June 2014, investing in the next stage of the plan to 2020.

==== Acquisition by Rutland Partners ====
In March 2014, Montagu Private Equity put Maplin up for sale with an expected return of between £100 million and £200 million. On 27 June 2014, Rutland Partners announced they were acquiring Maplin from Montagu for £85 million. Rutland typically focuses on restructuring opportunities, "special situation" investments. £5m of the capital was provided by Beringea from funds provided by Proven and Proven Growth and Income VCTs.

In September 2015, Oliver Meakin was appointed as CEO, setting new strategy for home automation and App based technology. In January 2018, Graham Harris was appointed new CEO replacing Oliver Meakin. It was reported in February 2018 that the company was seeking a buyer, and attempted to enter into a "pre pack" administration deal as part of a sale.

==== Service guarantees ====
Maplin introduced three service guarantees in an attempt to improve its customer service interface:

- Price match – This was available for any product which was available online or in-store. Maplin would price match online prices, but that company must be based in the United Kingdom, and have a High Street store somewhere in the country. Maplin did not price match Online Only stores such as Amazon, eBay, or Gumtree.
- 365 day 'No Quibble' – Returns were handled primarily in stores instead of being sent away.
- Free delivery – No delivery charge when purchasing within the store.

==== Store expansion ====
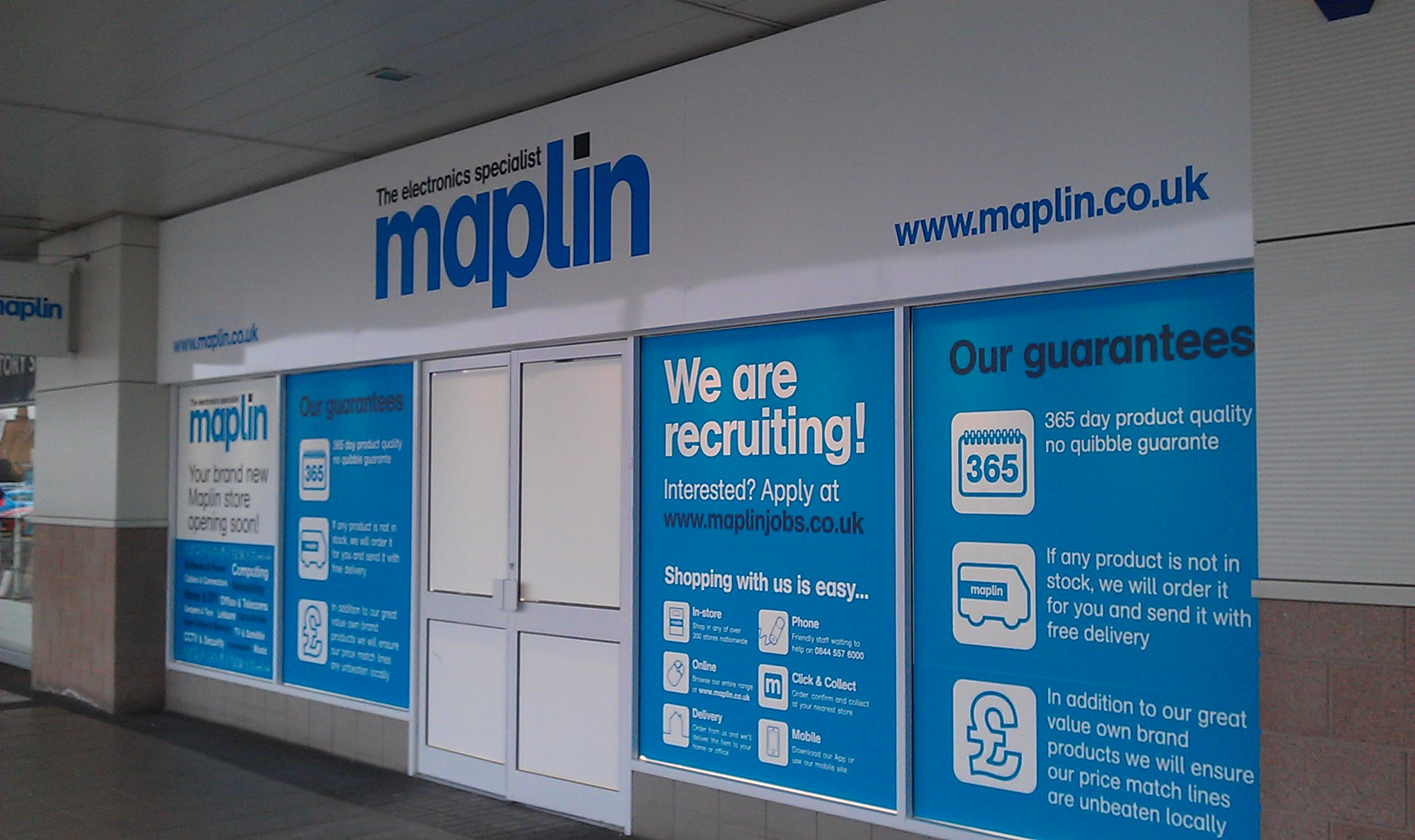
A store at One Stop Shopping Centre, Perry Barr, Birmingham, a few days before the scheduled opening in 2013

In the company's effort to remain part of the retail industry, it had invested £40 million to overhaul its e-commerce platforms on its website and through smart phone apps, and to reach a medium term goal of three hundred retail stores throughout the United Kingdom and Ireland before expanding abroad in 2015. The company was also looking to find vacant store outlets in key cities in which to expand.

In 2013, Maplin planned to open travel stores in airports and railway stations, where it would offer a tailored product selection, such as travel adaptors, batteries, and laptop chargers.

==== Product range ====
Maplin sold a large selection of electrical and electronic equipment such as audio/visual devices, components, computer devices and peripherals, cables, television and satellite equipment, everyday electrical items such as batteries and light bulbs, power adaptors and solar energy panels. The company also sold MP3 players, portable televisions and satellite navigation equipment.

The target market ranged from the general consumer to the more technical electronics hobbyist.

In November 2012, former Maplin CEO John Cleland stated, "We want to double the range of products we sell online from 15,000 to 30,000 stock keeping units (SKU) in the next three years, in some cases we will work on fulfilling orders by delivering straight from the manufacturer to the customer".

In November 2017, under the leadership of the new CEO Oliver Meakin, (appointed in September 2016) Maplin partnered with high street tech repair company, iSmash, to add smartphone repair centres to three stores.

=== Closure ===
Maplin announced on 28 February 2018 it had entered administration, after failing to find a buyer for the business.

PricewaterhouseCoopers (PwC) were assigned to handle the affairs of Maplin Electronics closure from 28 February. On 10 March 2018, a video announcement was made to staff members via the internal social media platform "Fuse", informing them that PwC had failed to locate a buyer for some or all of the business and would begin the store closure programme, which was expected to take around three months to conclude.

On 10 March 2018, PwC brought in insolvency and closure firm Hilco to manage the day-to-day affairs of the business, and to close the distribution centre, and both head offices at Brookfields, Rotherham and Churchill House, East London as well as making all staff redundant, some with as little as one day's notice.

On 30 April 2018, Maplin closed their website. On 12 May 2018, operations in the centre at Brookfields were shut down after pushing all remaining stock reserves out to stores. By 25 June 2018, all official Maplin stores across the United Kingdom had closed, with the Maplin company ceasing.

The chain's final owners were Rutland Partners.

== New "Maplin Online" ==
Following the demise of the original company, the Maplin brand was acquired by a new business, Maplin Online Ltd., in June 2018. On 26 October 2018, this was publicly announced on Twitter. On 30 January 2019, the Maplin website was relaunched, selling a range of electronics, CCTV and computing supplies. Maplin Online Ltd. was renamed Digital First Retail Ltd.— still trading as Maplin— on 31 May 2019. The legal obligations of the original Maplin Electronics Ltd.- such as warranty support- were not assumed.

The new Maplin remains online-only, and no new physical Maplin shops have been opened.
