= Columbia Threadneedle Investments =

American investment management firm

- Type: Subsidiary
- Industry: Investment management
- Predecessor: Columbia Management Group; Threadneedle Asset Management
- Founded: 2015; 11 years ago
- Headquarters: Atlantic Wharf, Boston, United States
- Key people: William F. "Ted" Truscott (CEO)
- Products: Mutual funds ETFs; Managed accounts 529 plan Closed-end funds
- AUM: US$672 billion (September 2024)
- Number of employees: 2,500 (2024)
- Parent: Ameriprise Financial
- Subsidiaries: F&C Asset Management
- Website: columbiathreadneedle.com

Columbia Threadneedle Investments is an American asset management firm. It is a subsidiary of Ameriprise Financial and operates as its asset management arm.

== Background ==
Columbia Threadneedle was formed in 2015 as the result of a merger between Columbia Management Group (an investment advisor and sponsor of mutual funds) and Threadneedle Asset Management (a non-US focused asset management firm based in the United Kingdom). Columbia Management Group and Threadneedle Asset Management were subsidiaries of Ameriprise Financial which were acquired in 2010 and 2003 respectively. Columbia Management was the asset management business of Bank of America.

In April 2021, Columbia Threadneedle acquired BMO's European asset management business for $845 million. The deal included F&C Asset Management. The BMO funds were subsequently rebranded to the Columbia Threadneedle name.

In October 2024, Columbia Threadneedle closed its standalone UK small stocks unit. This came at a time when investors were pulling money ahead of a UK Budget that would make stocks seem less attractive.

Columbia Threadneedle is headquartered in Boston with offices in 17 countries including Luxembourg, Singapore and the United Kingdom. Its businesses serve clients in the Americas, Europe, the Middle East and Asia.
