= Oulad Mtaa =

Coordinates: 32°53′N 7°34′W

Oulad Mtaa أولاد امطاع
- Rural commune and town
- Interactive map of Oulad Mtaa
- Country: Morocco
- Region: Marrakesh-Tensift-El Haouz
- Province: Al Haouz Province

Government
  - president de commune: Hamid abida

Population (2004)
  - Total: 5,557
- Time zone: UTC+0 (GMT)

Oulad Mtaa is a small town and rural commune in Al Haouz Province of the Marrakesh-Tensift-El Haouz region of Morocco. At the time of the 2004 census, the commune had a total population of 5557 people living in 1065 households.
