= Lon R. Greenberg =

Lon R. Greenberg has been CEO of UGI Corp. for 14 years, and chairman of UGI for 13 years.

== Career ==
Greenberg has been employed with UGI for 20 years, previously in the roles of senior vice president –legal and corporate development and as corporate and development counsel. Prior to his employment with UGI, Greenberg was president, CEO, chairman, and director of AmeriGas Propane, Inc. Greenberg is on the board of directors and the compensation committee of Aqua America, Inc.

== Compensation ==
While CEO of UGI in 2008, Greenberg earned a total compensation of $5,720,227, which included a base salary of $1,026,300; a cash bonus of $964,722; stock granted of $2,123,800; options granted of $1,524,000; and other compensation of $81,405. Greenberg ranks 18th within the Utilities sector of Forbes' special report on CEO compensation.

== See also ==
- List of chief executive officers
- Executive Officer
