= Columbia Management Group =

Former investment advisor and sponsor of mutual funds

- Founded: 1962; 64 years ago
- Founders: Jim Rippey; John Inskeep
- Defunct: 2015
- Fate: Became part of Columbia Threadneedle Investments after merger
- Headquarters: Portland, Oregon, U.S.

Columbia Management Group was an investment advisor and sponsor of mutual funds. In 2009, it was acquired by Ameriprise Financial and, in 2015, it was merged into Threadneedle to form Columbia Threadneedle Investments, the asset management subsidiary of Ameriprise.

== History ==
In 1962, Jim Rippey and John "Jerry" Inskeep founded Columbia Management Company in Portland, Oregon. In 1967, they opened the Columbia Growth Fund, the first mutual fund based in Oregon.

In 1997, FleetBoston Financial acquired the company for $460 million.

In 2001, Columbia acquired mutual funds from Liberty Financial (an affiliate of Liberty Mutual, which were rebranded as Columbia in 2003.

In September 2003, the company acquired Crabbe Huson Group.

In February 2004, several executives were fired after a trading scandal in which certain customers were given preferential treatment.

In 2004, FleetBoston Financial was acquired by Bank of America.

In 2007, Bank of America sold Marsico Capital Management back to Tom Marsico.

In November 2007, Bank of America injected $600 million into Columbia Management Group to prop up money market funds and institutional cash investments because of their exposure to structured investment vehicles.

In 2008, the company lost $459 million due to capital requirements required to prop up its money market funds.

In early 2009, Bank of America began soliciting offers for Columbia Management Group.

In May 2010, Ameriprise Financial acquired the company for $1 billion.
