= Noodle (dog) =

American pet influencer

- Species: Dog
- Breed: Pug
- Sex: Male
- Born: c. 2008
- Died: December 2, 2022
- Cause of death: Old age
- Occupation: Pet influencer
- Years active: 2021–2022
- Owner: Jonathan Graziano

Noodle (c. 2008 – December 2, 2022) was a pug who gained popularity in 2021 after appearing in a series of TikTok videos titled "Bones or No Bones". Noodle was honored by the New York State Senate in November 2021 for his positive impact on society and was the subject of a children's book published the following year.

After making multiple public appearances, Noodle died on December 2, 2022, at the age of 14.

== Bones or No Bones ==
Jonathan Graziano began posting the "Bones or No Bones" series on TikTok in October 2021. He described it as "the game where we find out if my 13-year-old pug woke up with bones and, as a result, we find out what kind of day we're going to have".

In each installment, Graziano lifts Noodle by his front legs to determine whether he will stand up or flop back down. He declares the day a "bones day" if Noodle stands, or a "no bones day" if he does not. A bones day is characterized by high ambition, productivity, and motivation, while a no-bones day places an emphasis on self-care, relaxation, and comfort.

Graziano established the rules of the game after adopting Noodle at age 7. Once the series gained popularity on TikTok, it became widely discussed in pop culture. Several public figures referenced the series, including the Minnesota Vikings football team, rock band The Smashing Pumpkins, and Louisiana Governor John Bel Edwards. Noodle has been called a "pet influencer" for his ability to sway many viewers' mental health and impact their day-to-day plans.

== Children's book ==
In Summer 2022, a picture book titled Noodle and the No Bones Day was published by Simon & Schuster. The story was written by Graziano and illustrated by Dan Tavis. It follows Graziano and Noodle on a particular no-bones day, with the stated goal of teaching children that it is "OK not to feel 100 percent all of the time".

Graziano and Noodle appeared on The Today Show in June 2022 to promote the book and perform the ritual for a live audience. The pair also appeared for a reading of the book at the annual Walk for the Animals at Barktober Fest in Rochester, New York.

== New York Senate recognition ==
On November 24, 2021, in observance of Senior Pet Month, Noodle was honored by the New York State Senate in an official proclamation recognizing his service to the "community, State and Nation". It commended Noodle for "bring[ing] joy and hope to New Yorkers during uncertain and challenging times". The proclamation was issued by New York Senator Samra Brouk in a ceremony at Lollypop Farm in upstate New York.
