= Network of Executive Women =

The Network of Executive Women (NEW) is a women's leadership organization serving the retail, consumer goods, financial services and technology industries. It represents more than 13,000 members from 900 companies, 100 corporate partners and 22 regions in the U.S. and Canada.

== Leadership ==
Sarah Alter was named president and CEO of NEW in June 2017. She was previously a vice president of Discover Financial and Quill Corporation.

Other NEW leaders include: Board Chair Monica Turner of Procter & Gamble; Vice Chair Abbe Luersman of Ahold Delhaize, Immediate Past Chair Lisa Walsh, Atlantic Street Capital Advisors, LLC; Treasurer Dagmar Boggs of Coca-Cola; and Secretary Elizabeth Marrion of Accenture.

== Research and insights ==
NEW conducts independent research and partners with other organizations to help companies achieve gender equality and inclusion. NEW released "The Female Leadership Crisis: Why Women Are Leaving (and What We Can Do About It)" in February 2018 with Mercer & Co and Accenture.

== Regional groups ==
The Network of Executive Women has 22 regional groups in the United States and Canada that provide local events, outreach and services to the communities where NEW members and supporters live and work.

- Atlanta
- Carolinas
- Chicago
- Cincinnati
- Denver
- Florida
- Greater Philadelphia
- Idaho
- Mid-Atlantic
- Nashville
- New England
- New York Metro
- North Texas
- Northern California
- Northwest Arkansas
- Pacific Northwest
- Phoenix
- Southern California
- South Texas
- Toronto
- Twin Cities
- Western Michigan

== History ==
NEW founders held organizational meetings in Atlanta, New York and elsewhere in 2000–2001, and the Network of Executive Women was incorporated April 1, 2001. Five thousand dollars in seed money was provided by The Minute Maid Company (then CEO Don Knauss was an early Champion; Ahold USA CEO Bill Grize was one of the first retail leaders to lend his support).

NEW held a kick-off meeting at the FMI Midwinter Executive Conference, January 22, 2001, and NEW's first official meeting was held April 2, 2001 in New York City. On June 1, 2001, NEW held its second official meeting and elected its first Board and Officer slate.
