= ISmash =

iSmash
- Industry: Electronics & technology repair
- Founder: Julian Shovlin
- Headquarters: London, United Kingdom
- Area served: United Kingdom
- Number of employees: 200 (2018)
- Website: ismash.com

iSmash is a high-street technology repair service, specialising in fixing smartphones, tablets and computers.

== History ==
iSmash was founded by Irish entrepreneur, Julian Shovlin, in 2013 to provide a same-day service for common smartphone repairs. The idea originated from Shovlin's own negative experience having his phone repaired, and wanting a solution for fixing damaged technology. Whilst a Business and Economics student at Trinity College Dublin, Shovlin set up his first repair shop at age 19 and invested £15,000 of savings in the business. This was later followed by a further £900,000 investment of seed money by angel investors.

== Stores ==
The first iSmash-branded store opened on the King’s Road, London in 2013. Since then, iSmash has opened 29 high street, shopping centre and train station locations across the UK, including London, Manchester, Bristol, Leeds, Brighton and Sheffield. When the Trinity Leeds store was opened, it caused some confusion with an existing iPhone and iPad repair shop called iPatch (founded in 2008), who deal exclusively with Apple product repairs. In Kingston upon Thames, the market for smartphone repairs, including services provided by iRepair Zone (established in 2013 and specializing in iPhone and Samsung repairs), faced new competition with the entry of iSmash.

A nationwide 50-store expansion began in 2018 and as of May 2021, 31 stores are open in total. Currently the company has a 3.7/5 ratings review on careers website Glassdoor and 67% of responding employees would recommend working at iSmash to their friends and 83% approve of the CEO.
