= ICG plc =

Asset management company

- Company type: Public
- Traded as: LSE: ICG; FTSE 100 component
- Industry: Financial services, asset management
- Founded: February 1989; 37 years ago
- Headquarters: London, England, UK
- Key people: William Rucker (Chairperson); Benoît Durteste (CEO)
- Revenue: ▲£1,036.0 million (2026)
- Operating income: ▲£627.8 million (2026)
- Net income: ▲£478.7 million (2026)
- AUM: $126 billion (2026)
- Website: www.icgam.com

ICG is a private equity investment firm focused on providing capital to help companies grow through private and public markets and provides a number of strategies and funds aimed at institutional investors. It is headquartered in London, England, with offices in a further 18 countries, and is a constituent of the FTSE 100 Index.

== History ==
The business was founded (as Intermediate Capital Group) by six investment professionals in 1989 and was first listed on the London Stock Exchange in 1994. In 2010 it was reported that the credit crunch was driving its growth. Intermediate Capital listed a new bond on the London Stock Exchange's Order book for Retail Bonds (ORB) in 2011.

ICG has diversified its business away from its origins in private debt and equity, buying the real estate business Longbow in 2014, and taking over management of the Graphite Enterprise Trust, which is now known as the ICG Enterprise Trust, in 2015. It hired an infrastructure investment team in 2018 and, in 2019, announced plans to build a private equity business in North America. The then $42.6 billion firm had a “strong ambition” to expand in the continent.

ICG has been a beneficiary of the trend for institutional investors to allocate assets to alternative investments, raising over €10bn during the year ended 31 March 2019.

In November 2022, it was announced ICG had acquired the Madrid-headquartered renewable energy platform, Dos Grados on behalf of its €1.5 billion ($1.56 billion) debut Infrastructure Fund (ICG Infra).

Intermediate Capital Group's shareholders consented for the company to change its name to ICG, at its Annual General Meeting in July 2025. In November 2025, ICG entered into a partnership with French asset management company Amundi, with the latter buying a 9.9% stake in ICG.
