= Groucho Club =

Private members' club in Soho, London

The Groucho Club
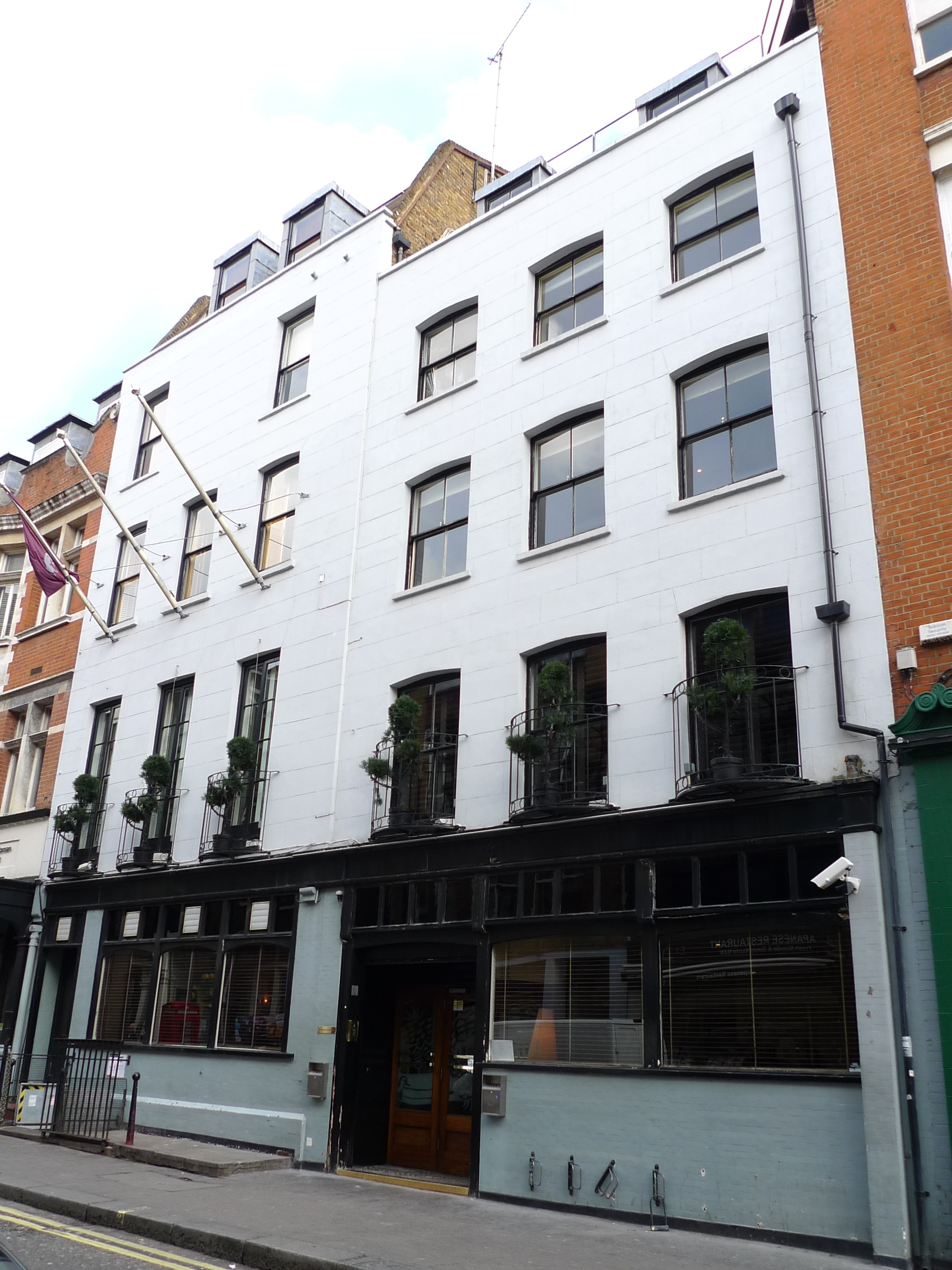

- Location within Greater London Location within England

General information
- Location: 45 Dean Street, London, England
- Coordinates: 51.5131°N 0.1341°W

The Groucho Club is a private members' club based in London, England. It was founded in 1985 and located on Dean Street in Soho. The majority of club members are mainly drawn from the publishing, media, entertainment and arts industries.

The club's facilities include three pubs, two restaurants, a snooker room, an enclosed terrace, 17 bedrooms for members or their guests and four event rooms, which are available for hire.

== History ==
The club opened on 5 May 1985. Its name is a reference to Groucho Marx saying he did not want to be a member of any club that would have him.

The club was owned by Graphite Capital from 2006 to 2015, when it was sold to a group of investors led by Isfield Investments and Alcuin Capital Partners. In 2022, the Groucho Club was purchased through Manuela and Iwan Wirth's Art Farm, which owns a group of boutique hotels and restaurants, for £40 million.

In March 2024, the club announced that it would be opening its inaugural branch outside of London at Bretton Hall near Wakefield in Yorkshire.

In November 2024, the club's license was suspended by Westminster City Council as a result of a criminal investigation.

During the closure, CEO Elli Jafari stepped down after 10 months in the role. Simon Cooke, former Managing Director of Ronnie Scott's Club, has taken over as interim managing director. The reopening introduced updated guest sign-in procedures, requiring digital registration through the Groucho app to enhance safety and security.

== Members ==
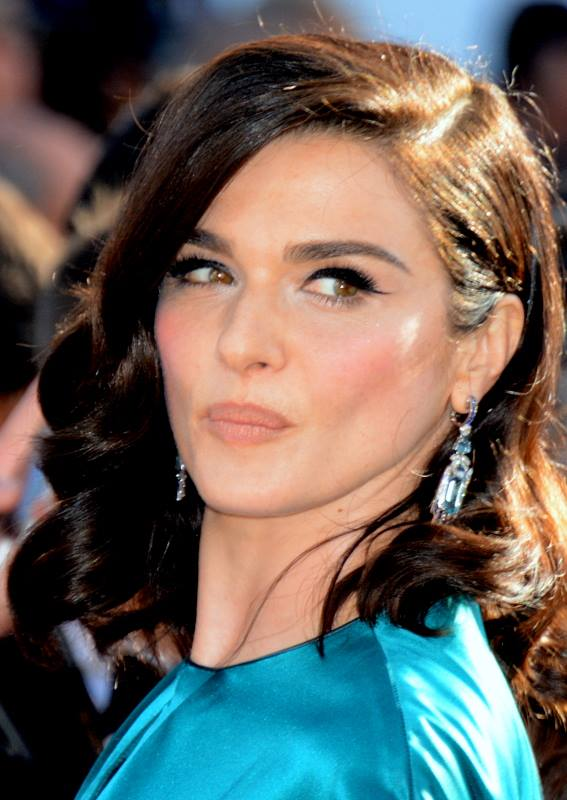
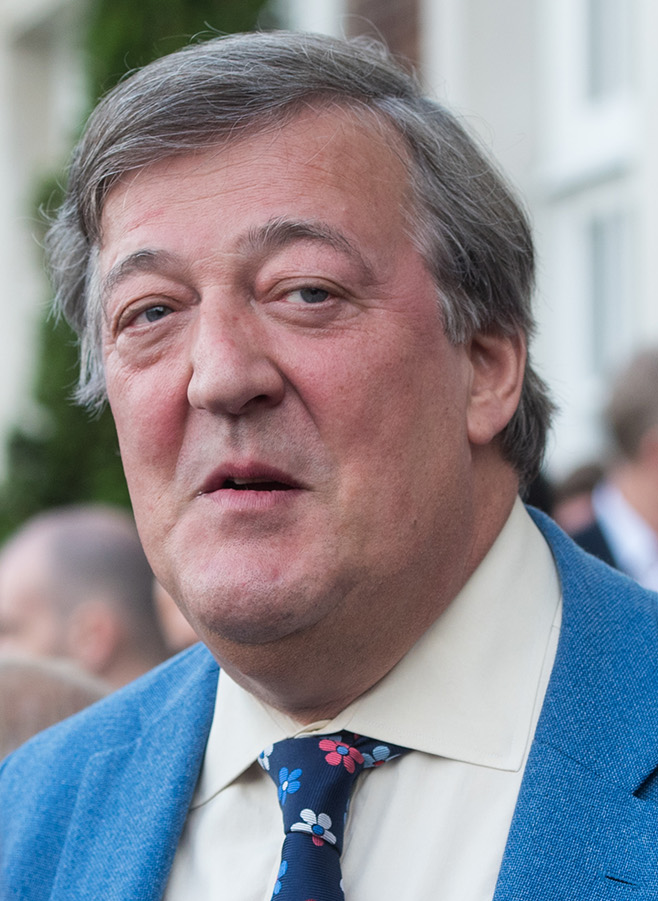
Rachel Weisz (left) and Stephen Fry (right) have at one time been members of the Groucho Club

Anyone who is proposed by two existing members may apply for membership, but applications are favoured from those working in the creative side of media and the arts.

Prominent members of the club have included Cara Delevingne, Nick Grimshaw, Harry Styles, Caroline Flack, Jarvis Cocker, Lily Allen, Melvyn Bragg, Stephen Fry, Noel Gallagher, Luke Pasqualino and Rachel Weisz.

== Art ==
The club has a large collection of contemporary art, curated by Nicki Carter, a graduate of Goldsmiths, University of London during the YBA period, erstwhile waitress and now the longest serving employee.

== The Groucho Club Maverick Award ==
Launched in 2010 as 'the antidote to other awards', The Groucho Club Maverick Award celebrates people who have broken the mould in their field by challenging and making a significant contribution to culture and the arts in the previous 12 months, either in the UK or internationally.
