= F&C Asset Management =

Financial management firm

F&C Asset Management Plc BMO Asset Management (Holdings) Plc Columbia Threadneedle AM (Holdings) Plc
- Type: Subsidiary
- Industry: Investment management
- Founded: 1972; 54 years ago
- Headquarters: London, England, U.K.
- Parent: Columbia Threadneedle Investments

F&C Asset Management Plc was an international asset management company. It was acquired by Bank of Montreal in 2014, and renamed as BMO Asset Management (Holdings) Plc in 2018. Its head office was in the City of London in Exchange House, Primrose Street, London. The company was then acquired by Columbia Threadneedle Investments in 2021 and renamed to Columbia Threadneedle AM (Holdings) Plc in 2022.

== History ==
F&C Asset Management was established in 1972, to take over the management of the Foreign & Colonial Investment Trust. HypoVereinsbank took a 50% stake in the company in 1989, increasing it to 90% in 1998. Eureko acquired HypoVereinsbank's stake in 2000 and acquired the remaining 10% (which had been held by Foreign & Colonial Investment Trust) in 2001.

F&C Asset Management retained the F&C brand for the enlarged business when it merged with Isis Asset Management in 2004. The enlarged business was then owned jointly by Eureko and Friends Provident (which had been the majority shareholder in Isis) although, after F&C Asset Management listed on the London Stock Exchange, Eureko divested much of its holding in 2007, and Friends Provident divested its holding in 2009.

F&C Asset Management was the official sponsor of Birmingham City F.C. between 2007 and 2011.

In 2014, F&C Asset Management was acquired by Bank of Montreal in deal worth £697 million, and then rebranded as BMO Global Asset Management. In 2021, BMO GAM (EMEA) became part of Columbia Threadneedle Investments, including the management of the F&C Investment Trust, and re-rebranded as Columbia Threadneedle AM (Holdings) Plc.
