= Food Marketing Institute =

American trade association

FMI, The Food Industry Association, is a national trade association for the food industry, especially food retailers and wholesalers, in the USA. FMI's members include approximately 40,000 retail food stores and 25,000 pharmacies, representing an industry with $800 billion in annual sales. The association's focus is on food marketing. It is based in Arlington, Virginia. FMI annually issues its Sidney R. Rabb Award for excellence in serving the consumer, the community and the industry.

== History ==
The Food Marketing Institute formed in 1977 with the merger of the Super Market Institute and the National Association of Food Chains.

In January 2020, the organization changed its name to FMI – The Food Industry Association to reflect its representation of the broader segment of the food industry.

== Political action ==
Via its political action committee, FoodPAC, the organization contributes approximately $400,000 per U.S. presidential election, primarily to Republican organizations.
