= Aerial Surveys =

Digital mapping company based in New Zealand

Aerial Surveys Ltd
- Formerly: Air Logistics; GeoSmart
- Type: Private
- Industry: Location-based services, Geographic information system, GPS, Cartography
- Founded: 1977
- Headquarters: Auckland, Mairangi Bay, New Zealand
- Area served: Oceania
- Products: SmartMap, SmartFind, Invite2GO
- Website: www.aerialsurveys.co.nz

Aerial Surveys Ltd (formerly GeoSmart) is a provider of location-based services, digital mapping data and images for the Oceania area, notably New Zealand. The company is one of only a handful of global companies producing digital maps for use in GPS applications.

== History ==
Originally and initially founded as Air Logistics, the company first provided aerial photography and mapping services.

Companies such as TomTom and Navman, use mapping data from GeoSmart on their popular handheld GPS devices, as do motor manufacturers such as BMW. The company also provides mapping data via web services, with applications such as a website that allows users to send custom invitations that include mapping directions for guests.

In March 2007, GeoSmart was acquired by the New Zealand Automobile Association (NZAA). From GeoSmart's view, the NZAA would provide additional support for their already existing task of driving down all public roads in the country in order to collect geographic data and information and update its already-existing geospatial database representing those very roads.

In 2008, GeoSmart launched the RAPIDcV mapping car, which is an ongoing program to redrive all of New Zealand. This is to enhance the car navigation database used by brands including Navman, TomTom, Nav N Go, Siemens VDO and Horizon. The RAPIDcV (Road attributes, points of interest, imagery data capture vehicle) uses technology to capture the road centreline of all of New Zealand's roads to an accuracy of 0.15 metres. It does this with a number of technologies including inertial measurement unit (IMU) that uses gyroscopes and accelerometers. This technology compensates for situations where the traditional differential GPS accuracy is lost when the satellite signal is poor, such as behind volcanic hill shadows, dense forest canopies and high rise urban areas. It has a number of cameras on board capturing lane information, street signs, turn restrictions and points of interest to enhance and keep up to date GeoSmart's car navigation and web mapping products. It is also taking a 360 degree panoramic image every 50 metres. In order to support truck navigation as well as multi mode navigation it is collecting information on the incline and camber of each corner, a feature which is used for truck safety warnings in fleet management systems.

== See also ==
- Geographic Data Files
- Navteq
- Tele Atlas
