= MiTAC Computing Technology Corp. =

Company of Taiwan

- Type: Public
- Industry: Information Technology
- Founded: 1 September 2014
- Headquarters: No.200, Wen Hwa 2nd Rd., Guishan Dist., Taoyuan City 33383, Taiwan, R.O.C., Taoyuan City, Taiwan
- Area served: Worldwide
- Key people: Billy Ho, Chairman
- Brands: MiTAC Computing Technology Corp.
- Website: https://www.mitaccomputing.com/

MiTAC Holdings Corporation was formed on September 12, 2013, through a stock swap from MiTAC International Corp. As part of a restructuring aimed at future operational objectives, the Group established MiTAC Computing Technology Corporation on September 1, 2014, to focus on designing and manufacturing servers for data centers and enterprises, offering solutions from edge to cloud computing, including hyperscale data centers, AI/HPC systems, and energy-efficient technologies like liquid cooling.

== History ==
MiTAC entered the server ODM business in 1999 and has designed and manufactured servers utilizing various processors, including Intel x86, SPARC, IBM Power ISA, and ARM architectures. The company expanded its capabilities in 2007 by acquiring Tyan Computer, which strengthened its ability to offer high-performance server solutions.

MiTAC Holdings Corporation, the parent company of MiTAC Computing Technology Corp., was established in 2013 and listed on the Taiwan Stock Exchange (TSE: 3706). MiTAC, along with TYAN, IBM, Google, Mellanox, and NVIDIA formed the OpenPOWER Consortium. In 2014, MiTAC International Corp. spun off its Cloud Computing Business Group to create MiTAC Computing Technology Corp., which became operational on September 1. TYAN continued as a key server brand under MiTAC Computing. That same year, MiTAC received the 2013 Supplier Award from Fujitsu.

In 2015, MiTAC Computing entered a distribution agreement with Avnet Embedded to distribute its cloud database and computing equipment. The company has maintained partnerships with industry leaders, including AMD and Intel, contributing to advancements in server technology.

In 2016, through its TYAN brand, introduced the TN71-BP012 server featuring the IBM POWER 8 Architecture, in line with the OpenPOWER Foundation’s design principles.

MiTAC launched 5G RAN solutions and the Capri OPC server at the OCP Global Summit in 2021, contributing to the 5G O-RAN ecosystem and the Open Compute Project (OCP) community.

In 2023, Intel transferred the rights to manufacture and sell products based on its Data Center Solutions Group (DSG) designs to MiTAC Computing Technology Corp. That same year, the company introduced high-performance server solutions integrating Intel’s Max and Flex series Data Center GPUs with 5th Gen Intel Xeon Scalable Processors and unveiled a new immersion cooling solution. It also showcased Intel Server M50FCP and D50DNP family solutions for cloud and data center environments and launched new OCP server solutions, including the Capri 2, Goldstone, and Whitestone2 WS1S12.

At COMPUTEX 2024, MiTAC launched servers based on Intel® Xeon® 6th Generation Processors, targeting AI, HPC, cloud, and enterprise workloads. MiTAC announced the full integration of the TYAN® server brand into its operations, effective October 1. At SC24, MiTAC Computing unveiled its AI and HPC servers featuring AMD EPYC 9005 CPUs and AMD Instinct MI325X GPUs.

In 2024, MiTAC Computing integrated the Tyan server brand into its operations, consolidating product branding under the MiTAC Computing name and updating its logo and website.

== Products ==
MiTAC Computing Technology Corporation offers a range of products, including:

- Rack-Mount Servers
- Tower Server
- ORAN servers
- HPC Servers
- AI Servers
- Storage Servers
- Blade Servers
- GPU Servers
- Cloud Computing Servers
- OCP Servers
