= Hybrid navigation =

Simultaneous use of multiple navigation systems

Hybrid navigation is the simultaneous use of more than one navigation system for location data determination, needed for navigation. By using multiple systems at once, the accuracy as a whole is improved. It also allows for a more reliable navigation system, as if one system fails, the other can kick in and provide accurate navigation for the user. Especially for self-driving cars, the exact and continuous knowledge of the navigating object's location is essential.

== Function ==
GPS and other satellite based systems (GLONASS, GALILEO, BEIDOU, QZSS) provide a way to learn one's location, but these methods require free field conditions in order to receive the radio signal. Various satellite systems are subject to switching-off or reduction of data precision by the company or government that runs them. They are also prone to intentional or unintentional disturbances. Even passing through a tunnel or a garage interrupts the data flow. In situations where the signal cannot be received reliably, alternate sources of location data are needed. Combining GPS with other methods can avoid these limitations, but each method has its own specific limitations. A hybrid system provides fault tolerance for each underlying method and improves the overall precision of the result.

The hybrid system needs to decide how to choose among the different methods at any given time. One solution is a triple configuration, allowing 'result voting' for data collecting systems.

Alternate systems that supply navigational data include:

- Beacons providing radio- or infrared based signals.
- Inertial navigation systems. This system determines location by summing the movement vectors from start of the trip or some other waypoint whose location is well-defined.
- Incremental sensors. This system uses vehicle speed data supplied by a Fleet Management System.
- Differential GPS. This system uses terrestrial radio transmitters with well-defined locations that broadcast information about how accurate the GPS signals are at identifying the locations of these transmitters.

== See also ==
- Automotive navigation system
- Hybrid positioning system
- Navigation Data Standard
- Sensor fusion
