= DBTel =

Taiwanese telecommunications company

DBTEL Incorporated
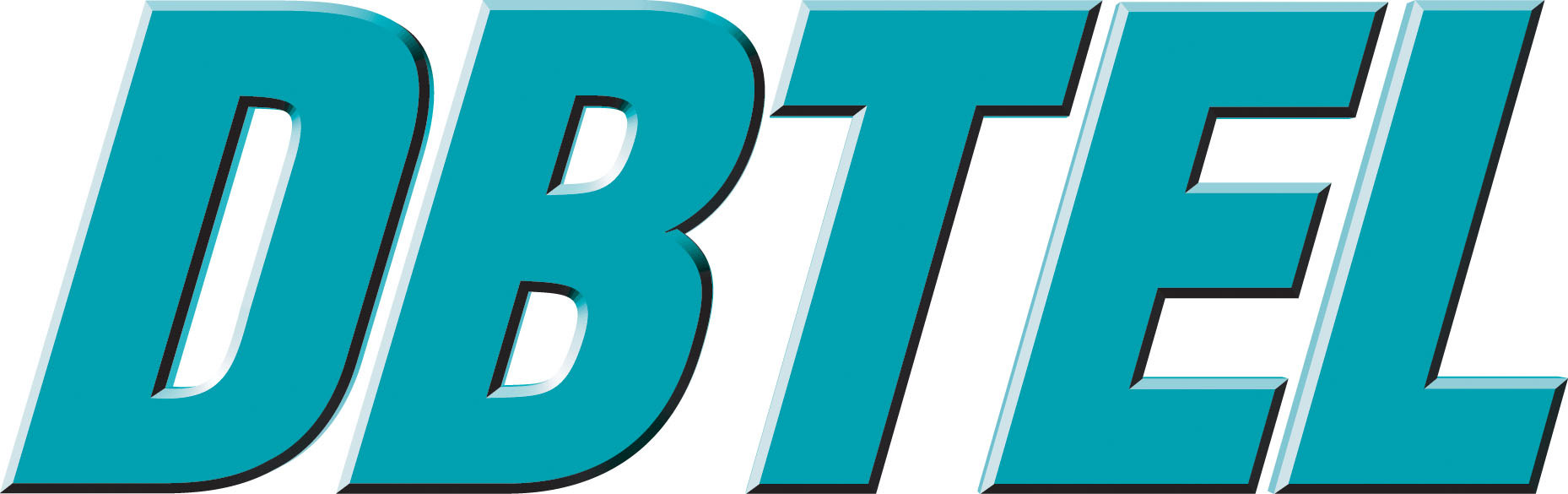
- Native name: Current name: 鼎創達; Founding name: 大霸電子
- Company type: Incorporated
- Industry: Telecommunications
- Founded: 1979
- Founder: Michael Mou
- Headquarters: Taipei, Taiwan
- Key people: Michael Mou (Founder & CEO)
- Products: Mobile phones
- Website: english.dbtel.com at the Wayback Machine (archived 7 November 2015)

DBTel

Current name Ding Chuang Da
- Traditional Chinese: 鼎創達
- Simplified Chinese: 鼎创达
Transcriptions
Standard Mandarin
- Hanyu Pinyin: Dǐng Chuàng Dá
Yue: Cantonese
- Jyutping: Ding^{2} Cong^{3} Daat^{6}

Founding name Daba Dianzi
- Traditional Chinese: 大霸電子
- Simplified Chinese: 大霸电子
Transcriptions
Standard Mandarin
- Hanyu Pinyin: Dàbà Diànzǐ
Yue: Cantonese
- Jyutping: Daai^{6} Baa^{3} Din^{6} Zi^{2}

DBTEL Inc. (Chinese: 鼎創達; pinyin: Dǐng Chuàng Dá; formerly Chinese: 大霸電子; pinyin: Dàbà Diànzǐ) is a multinational telecommunications company based in Taipei, Taiwan. Founded in 1979 by Michael Mou, the company initially focused on cordless telephones. In the 1990s, DBTEL once took up 30% of the original equipment manufacturer market share for United States cordless phones. It later became an original equipment manufacturer (OEM) for cell phones. Between 1998 and 2002, it made phones for Motorola and at one point was its largest manufacturer. The two companies ended their contract after legal disputes and weakness in the mobile phone market. After facing numerous challenges, DBTEL, which had unstable OEM sales, transformed from an OEM company into selling its own brand.

DBTEL became the first Taiwanese mobile phone producer to receive China's authorisation in 2000 to market branded cell phones and released its first branded mobile phone in the country in June 2001. By 2003, the company had sold five million of its phones that year in China. By number of mobile phones sold there that year, DBTEL was ranked number six in tier-one and tier-two cities and number four in other cities. With 85% of its revenue in China, DBTEL caused observers to worry that it was too reliant on the country. After the company faced competition from Motorola, Nokia, and Samsung in China and began running increasingly large deficits, it returned to making OEM sales in addition to selling its owned branded projects. DBTEL lost even more money after Taiwanese mobile phone competitors BenQ, OKWAP, and MiTAC Holdings all received the Chinese domestic sales rights in 2005. Analysts criticised DBTEL for repeatedly cutting back their financial forecasts which made investors lose their trust in the company.

In September 2005, the Taiwan Taipei District Prosecutors Office and other government agencies launched an investigation into insider trading at DBTEL. The investigators alleged that DBTEL had several times sold large amounts of shares before disclosing negative news that caused the stock prices to drop. The company's chairman was acquitted in one trial and convicted in a second one, with DBTEL changing its Chinese name after the controversy. In 2020, DBTEL applied to end the over-the-counter trading of its stock in November 2020 and acquired outstanding shares.

== History ==
=== Early history ===
DBTEL was founded in 1979 by Michael Mou (Chinese: 莫浩然) with a focus on making telephony products for other companies. At its beginning, the company did research on making cordless telephones. Beginning in the 1990s, DBTEL did research into how to produce mobile phones. DBTEL once took up 30% of the original equipment manufacturer (OEM) market share for United States cordless phones in the 1990s. It began investing in China in 1994 to increase its production capacity and decrease the production cost. DBTEL was a supplier for Lexmark International's Lexmark 5700 colour printer. Lexmark sued DBTEL in 1998 for allegedly leading Lexmark to incorrectly believe it could take care of design adjustments since it had the engineering acumen and manufacturing volume. The delay, Lexmark asserted in a US federal court lawsuit, led to the printer's not being shipped to consumers for months over the deadline. Owing its long-term research into high-frequency cordless telephones, DBTEL was able to manufacture products that met the GSM standard in 1998. As DBTEL was facing headwinds from the decreasing profits for making cordless telephones, founder Michael Mou had to find a new way for the company to grow. Motorola at that time needed to find a manufacturer to reduce its production costs, so in 1998 the two companies signed an agreement. DBTEL began making GSM phones for Motorola and began producing phones for Siemens, Alcatel Mobile, and other companies in the world.

In 1999, DBTEL released its inaugural cell phone after having produced cordless telephones for numerous years. In a first for Taiwanese cell phone producers, it secured China's authorisation in 2000 to market branded cell phones in the country. DBTEL used to be Motorola's largest manufacturer. When the mobile phone market experienced weakness in 2000, Motorola responded by cutting its requests for DBTEL and instead built the phones in their own factories. DBTEL experienced a revenue decline and began losing money. By 2001, the two companies' relationship deteriorated further. DBTEL was forced to stop production after not receiving any orders from Motorola for four months. After facing numerous challenges, DBTEL, which had unstable original equipment manufacturer (OEM) sales, transformed from an OEM company into selling its own brand. In June 2001, it released a branded mobile phone, its first foray into China as its own brand called "Dí Bǐ Tè" (Chinese: 迪比特). In November 2001, it released a branded mobile phone in Taiwan called "DBTEL".

Motorola filed a lawsuit against DBTEL in 2002 accusing it of divulging trade secrets and the company's contract ended that year. After DBTEL's Motorola contract ended in April 2002, both the company's stock price and employee morale dropped. Business Today said in 2002 that DBTEL was widely considered to be like The Boy Who Cried Wolf in its repeated cutbacks of its financial outlook in four of the past six years.

=== Struggles leading to operating losses ===
In 2002's first six months, over 1.6 million DBTEL cell phones were purchased. 5% of the cell phone market in China was captured by DBTEL's brand in 2002. Its phone lacked General Packet Radio Service which The Wall Street Journal said could dissuade radio operators from adopting DBTEL's technology. In 2002, DBTEL released two phones, which the Financial Times described as "a colour-screen model and one claimed to be the smallest 'clam-shell' phone in the world". DBTEL released diamond-studded cell phones in 2003 in the colours of black, gold, red, and white and bearing names like Venus, Elf, and Allure. Whereas the least expensive diamond phone cost A$1,370 (US$889), the most expensive three-carat one retailed for A$45,650 (US$29,606). The company sold 90% of its phones in China and the remainder in Taiwan and Southeast Asia in 2004. DBTEL aimed to overtake Nokia which ranked first in the world in mobile phone sales after it achieved strong results in mainland China at the beginning. The company used Taiwanese actress Stephanie Shiao, Hong Kong singer Sammi Cheng, and Indian actress Reema Sen to promote its products and opened its flagship store on Fuxing Road in Taipei. DBTEL established its Chinese headquarters in the Shanghai Xinzhuang Industrial Zone where it continued doing research and development and began marketing teams. Through a strong stock market performance, DBTEL was able to accumulate more money to grow its business in China.

In 2003, the company sold five million of its phones in China that year and achieved a gross margin of 25%. By number of mobile phones sold in China that year, DBTEL was ranked number six in tier-one and tier-two cities and number four in other cities. With 85% of its revenue from China, the company had a profit of NT$2 billion (US$65,000,000) in 2003. Observers became concerned that owing to its deep reliance on China's volatile economy, DBTEL would be unable to continue making money. The company experienced challenges in the Chinese market with mobile phone prices quickly falling and competition increasing. It released a new phone brand called "Dbtel International" to compete against Nokia and Samsung Electronics. In 2004, owing to competition from Motorola, Nokia, and Samsung which were focusing more heavily and China, and its own unsuccessful attempts, DBTEL lost NT$2 billion (US$65,000,000). After facing challenges with selling its own branded products, DBTEL returned to making original equipment manufacturer (OEM) sales in a dual-pronged approach of having both branded and OEM sales. It continued to be battered by the market through competition from parallel imports and white-label products, losing NT$2.4 billion (US$78,000,000) in the first half of 2004. Before 2005, the company had been the only Taiwanese firm with domestic sales rights in China. In May of that year, BenQ and OKWAP received the Chinese domestic sales rights, while MiTAC Holdings received the rights in September. Several mergers and acquisitions that year, which included separate activity from Foxconn and Siemens, led to increased competition in the OEM and original design manufacturer (ODM) arenas. The increased competition exacerbated DBTEL's troubles.

In a June 2005 meeting, Michael Mou proposed splitting the company into three to try to attract people into investing. In the first three quarters of 2005, the company had a loss of NT$3.438 billion (US$111,300,000). Most of the loss was from the company's Shanghai subsidiary, Shanghai DBTEL, which had been established in 1993. DBTEL shrank its presence in China: It once had 27 branches and 10,000 employees there but was down to nine branches and 2,000 employees in 2005. Beginning in September 2005, DBTEL announced it would cease injecting money into DBTEL Shanghai so that the subsidiary would no longer cause monetary damage to the parent company. In the midst of experiencing deep monetary troubles, Shanghai DBTEL for three months failed to compensate suppliers. Travelling to Shanghai, the company's debtees asked to be paid.

=== Later history ===
The company planned to build a 20,000-ping (66,100 m^{2}) headquarters at Dingpu High-tech Industrial Park but had to decrease its area by half following the failure of an attempted NT$3.8 billion (US$120,000,000) selling of shares. After uncovering unusual DBTEL stock trading happening, several government departments led by the Taiwan Taipei District Prosecutors Office collaborated on conducting an investigation into insider trading. At the end of September 2005, prosecutors began an insider trading inquiry regarding two company executives: Michael Mou, the company's chairman, and Kuo Pei-chih, its president and Mou's wife. Investigators said DBTEL had revealed to the public that it had experienced losses and was adjusting its financial outlook down right after selling many shares of its stock. The company was accused of funnelling funds they had obtained through shorting company shares to subsidiary companies including to its Shanghai subsidiary. The company denied the allegations. An analyst at SinoPac Securities Corporation criticised DBTEL, stating, "We haven't covered Dbtel for a long period of time and we have no plan to put the stock on our investment list. Untrustworthy financial forecasts have upset investors' stomachs." After the announcement of the inside trading investigation, Moneyweekly said, "In fact, looking at the ups and downs of the mobile phone industry, the biggest crisis DBTEL faces is not just emptying the cloud of doubts, but the bigger crisis will be the battle of life and death for the division of labor in the mobile phone industry. If DBTEL can no longer play its core role or is unable to successfully create their own brand, I am afraid that they face a more serious crisis of being eliminated." Business Next noted in 2004 that the company had to repeatedly curtail its financial projections.

Prosecutors prevented company chairman Michael Mou from leaving Taiwan for a decade. He was acquitted in one insider trading trial but was convicted in a second trial. DBTEL changed its Chinese name from Dàbà Diànzǐ (Chinese: 大霸電子) to Dǐng Chuàng Dá (Chinese: 鼎創達) after the 2005 launch of the insider trading investigation. Mou was president of the company in 2014. DBTEL applied to end the over-the-counter trading of its stock in November 2020 and acquired outstanding shares. Taipei Exchange approved the application.

== See also ==
- List of companies of Taiwan
