= Map24 =

Navteq Map24
- Website type: web mapping
- Available in: multilingual
- Owner: Navteq
- Creator: Navteq
- Current status: inactive

Map24 was a free online mapping service, providing street level maps and driving directions for many parts of the world. Map24 was taken offline on September 15, 2011. www.map24.com was pointing to here.com. However, the Web Archive has archived Map24 website and it is fully functional, as the former original. Map24 was owned and operated by Mapsolute GmbH, a producer of geographic software until they were acquired in 2007 by NAVTEQ, now called HERE. The website had five million users in Germany and 150 million monthly page views.

The service was powered by a company-owned technology called MapTP which offers features like a 3-D route flight and complete interactivity with each map.

== Areas covered by Map24 ==
- Asia
  - Bahrain
  - Kuwait
  - Oman
  - Qatar
  - Saudi Arabia
  - United Arab Emirates
- Europe
  - Andorra
  - Austria
  - Belgium
  - Denmark
  - Finland
  - France
  - Germany
  - Hungary
  - Iceland
  - Ireland
  - Italy
  - Liechtenstein
  - Luxembourg
  - Monaco
  - Netherlands
  - Norway
  - Poland
  - Portugal
  - Romania
  - San Marino
  - Slovakia
  - Slovenia
  - Spain
  - Sweden
  - Switzerland
  - Turkey (Istanbul, Ankara, İzmir)
  - United Kingdom
  - Vatican City
- North America
  - Canada
  - Mexico
  - Puerto Rico
  - United States
- Oceania
  - Australia
  - New Zealand
- South America
  - Brazil
