= Standard Interchange Format =

Standard Interchange Format, called SIF, is a geospatial data exchange format. A standard or neutral format used to move graphics files between DOD Project 2851 and is currently codified in Content Standard for Digital Geospatial Metadata maintained by the Federal Geographic Data Committee.

Unit 69 of the NCGIA Core Corriculum in GIS states that SIF is a "popular data exchange format for many GIS packages" and was "developed to support exchange of data between Intergraph and other systems."

Navteq uses Standard Interchange Format (SIF)

Another example of data available in SIF format can be found online from the NASA's BOREAS project that also claims that the SIF format is "not well documented."

Additional criticism of SIF, along with recognition of SIF's ubiquity and utility for exchanging data, is acknowledged in the online journal article "Is a Standard Terrain Data Format Necessary?"

== See also ==
- Map database management
