= Geographic Data Files =

Geographic Data Files (GDF) is an interchange file format for geographic data. In contrast with generic GIS formats, GDF provides detailed rules for data capture and representation, and an extensive catalog of standard features, attributes and relationships. The most recent extension expanded applicability further towards pedestrian navigation, 3-D map rendering, and advanced driver-assistance systems (ADAS).

GDF is commonly used for data interchange in many industries such as automotive navigation systems, fleet management, dispatch management, road traffic analysis, traffic management, and automatic vehicle location.

Originated as a flat plain-text file, GDF is not intended to be used directly for any large scale geographic application and normally requires conversion into a more efficient format. Consumability has been increased with most-recent developments for XML and SQL renditions.

The maps in GDF format are provided by many map vendors such as HERE, TomTom, Mapscape BV, GeoSmart, Automotive Navigation Data, AutoNavi and NavInfo.

== Standardisation ==
GDF is an international standard that is used to model, describe and transfer road networks and other geographic data.

The standard was initially drawn up by CEN in co-operation with digital map providers, automotive and electronic equipment manufacturers. The outcome of these standardisation efforts (CEN GDF 3.0, or ENV14825:1996) has formed the major input to a global standard created by ISO/TC204 Sub Working group 3:

- ISO GDF 4.0, formally referred to ISO14825:2004, now replaced by
- ISO GDF 5.0, formally referred to ISO14825:2011.

However, despite the existence of an ISO GDF standard, the nature of model abstractions as well as semantic interpretations and proprietary content extensions lead to interoperability issues between flavors of GDF map products from different vendors. In practice the GDF files are not fully interchangeable due to vendor specific extensions. To this end, GDF5.0 provides major improvements in terms of extended meta data and flags for signalling implementation choices.

=== The new GDF5.0 ===
The specifications of GDF5.0 were developed and compiled between 2001 and 2008, involving experts from Australia, Canada, Czech Republic, France, Germany, Japan, Republic of Korea, the Netherlands, and the United States of America. Extensive activities towards harmonization with ISO/TC211 standards were undertaken. GDF 5.0 was published in July 2011.

Major GDF5.0 enhancements include UML model migration & refinements; harmonization with linear referencing and geo-spatial web standards; support for 3-D content and time coordinates; comprehensive character set and phonetic representations; and new XML and SQL based delivery formats.

=== Background and rationale of GDF standardization ===
By the late 1980s, producers and users of digital road map data became increasingly aware of the need for a common data interchange standard. Lack of such a standard was seen as an impediment to the commercial growth and success of industries using such data. Before the advent of the Intelligent Transport Systems (ITS) industry, development of spatial data interchange standards was done mostly on a regional basis and not designed for the specialised requirements of road transport-related applications.

In the 1990s, the GDF standard was instrumental in enabling the European business-to-business (B2B) market for in-vehicle navigation in that it provided interoperability for exchanging digital map data between map manufacturers and navigation system integrators. The GDF specifications provided a base for both the capturing of geographic content and the exchanging of it. Its original design foresaw a powerful, application-independent model, while its initial rendition as a standard specifically addressed the requirements for the richness of navigable map databases. Since then, GDF has evolved in terms of data modelling capabilities, broadened international applicability, expanded geographic domains, and diversified exchange formats. As a result, GDF covers a wide range of application domains and has been adapted to many geo-spatial technologies.

== See also ==
- GeoIT file formats
  - Geography Markup Language
  - Keyhole Markup Language
- Global Positioning System (GPS)
- Map database management
- OGC standards
