= Ergs =

Ergs or ERGS may refer to:

- Erg, a unit of energy
- Electronic Route Guidance System
- Enniskillen Royal Grammar School, in Northern Ireland
- The Ergs!, an American punk band
- Queens' Ergs, an indoor rowing relay race

== See also ==
- Erg
