= Mapscape BV =

Coordinates: 51.455200°N 5.394580°E

Mapscape BV is a Netherlands-based independent business-to-business digital maps service provider. The company was founded in 2007 by Henk Eemers and Ralf Stollenwerk. It is active in the navigation and automotive industry. Mapscape is involved in content aggregation, compilation and testing of digital maps for navigation purposes. The maps are targeted for use in the automotive industry in e.g. online and offline navigation and location-based services.

The company's automotive customers include BMW and Volkswagen, as well as navigation system suppliers, such as Continental, TomTom, Harman International, NNG, Bosch, and Elektrobit. The company uses raw navigation data from companies such as HERE Technologies, TeleAtlas, NavInfo, and MapMyIndia which it compiles into the proprietary formats used by various navigation systems.

Furthermore, Mapscape is involved in testing and certifying a new proposed industry standard automotive map format, called the Navigation Data Standard (NDS) initiative.

In January 2011, Mapscape was acquired by and is now a wholly owned subsidiary of Chinese digital map supplier NavInfo.

== See also ==
- Geographic Data Files
- Automotive navigation system
- Map database management
- ESRI shape
- MapInfo TAB format
