= Navigation Data Standard =

Format for automotive-grade navigation databases

Navigation Data Standard (NDS) e.V.
- NDS Logo
- Type: Not for Profit Consortium
- Headquarters: c/o EECF/2, Navigation; Volkswagen AG; Berliner Ring 2 D-38440 Wolfsburg; Germany
- Location: Wolfsburg
- Website: www.nds-association.org

The Navigation Data Standard (NDS) is a standardized format for automotive-grade navigation databases, jointly developed by automobile manufacturers and suppliers. NDS is an association registered in Germany. Members are automotive OEMs, map data providers, and navigation device/application providers.

NDS aims to develop a standardized binary database format that allows the exchange of navigation data between different systems. NDS separates navigation software from navigation data, thus enhancing flexibility for creating various navigation products for end users. In addition to this interoperability, NDS databases support incremental updates, protection against illegal use, and compactness.

NDS products have been available in the market since 2012, among others in BMW, Daimler, and Volkswagen cars.

== Objective ==
The vision of NDS is to provide a leading worldwide map standard for automotive-grade use. A "leading standard" means that the map format shall:

- be widely used in the navigation industry and be adopted by leading suppliers of navigation maps
- be interoperable between navigation platforms
- enable up-to-date maps
- be globally applicable
- fulfil specific needs of all regions of the world

"Automotive grade" implies that:

- the standard is developed and maintained as a cooperative effort by leading OEMs and suppliers in the automotive industry.
- the standard consistently supports all automotive-specific use cases for map-related data.
- the standard supports advanced navigation technologies like eHorizon, autonomous driving, and cloud solutions
- the design is validated through large-scale adoption, implementation, and deployment.

To realize this vision, NDS pursues the following goals:

- fast implementation of extensions and changes to the NDS standard
- promotion of the NDS standard to increase its adoption in the worldwide automotive market through ease of use and efficient implementation
- securing the freedom to operate the NDS standard
- certification of compliance with the NDS standard

To support the adoption of the navigation standard and reach its goals, NDS supports NDS projects (e.g. by providing tools and support), constantly develops the standard technically, and aims at enlarging the association.

== Design model ==
NDS uses the SQLite Database File Format. An NDS database can consist of several product databases, and each product database may be divided further into update regions. This concept supports a flexible and consistent versioning concept for NDS databases and makes it possible to integrate databases from different database suppliers into one NDS database. The inner structure of databases complying with NDS is further characterized by building blocks, levels and the content itself.

=== Product database ===
Each product database is delivered by one database supplier, has its own version control and can therefore be updated independently from other product databases. Product databases can contain one or more building blocks. Product databases cover a geographic area, which can be further divided into several update regions. Example of a product database: Europe basic navigation supplied by TomTom.

=== Update region ===
An update region represents a geographic area in a database that can be subject to an update. Update regions thus enable incremental and partial updating of defined geographic regions within an NDS database. Example: Each European country within the product "Europe basic navigation" may be presented by a separate update region.

=== Building block ===
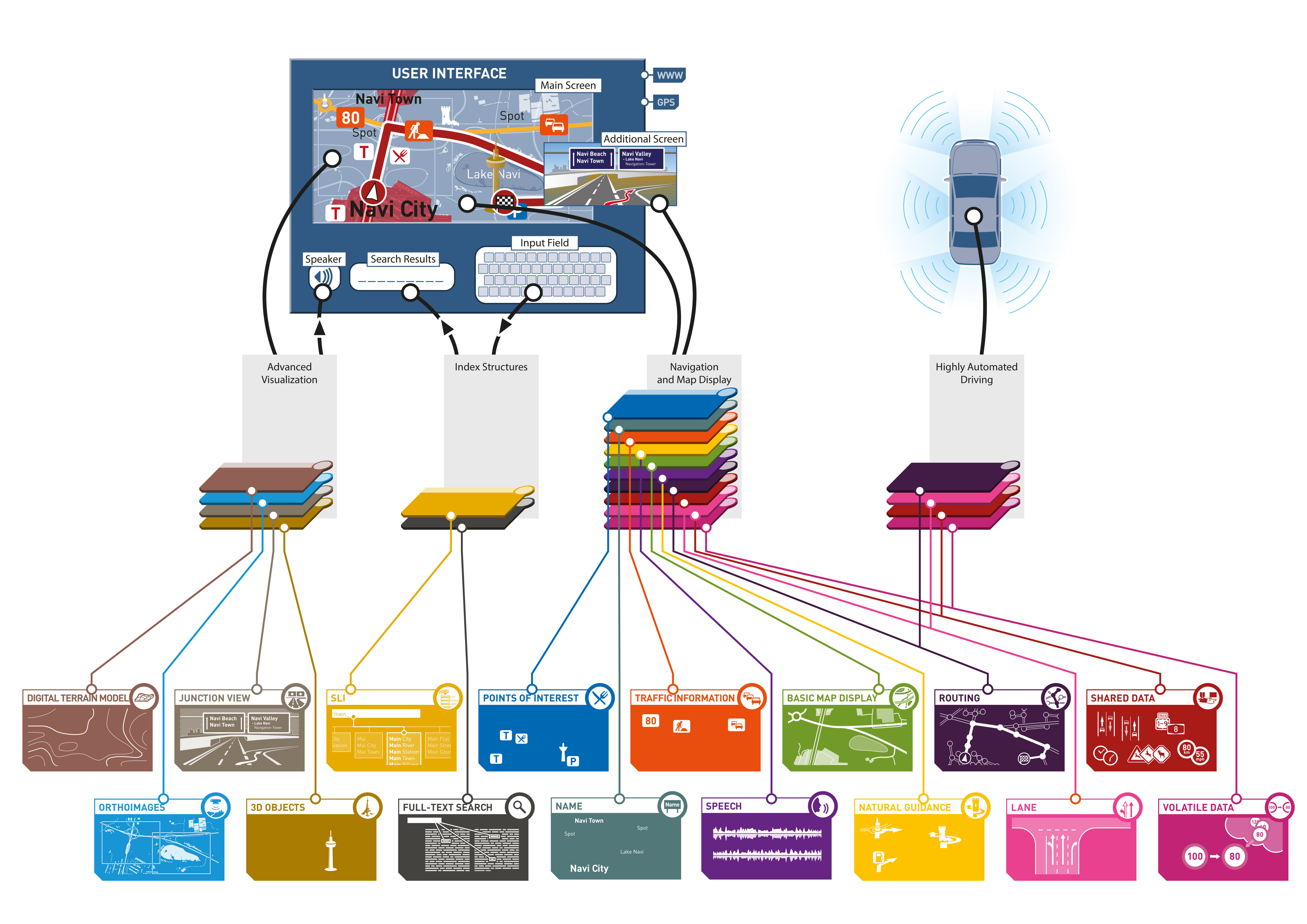
NDS building blocks

All navigation data in an NDS database belongs to a specific building block. Each building block addresses specific functional aspects of navigation, such as names for location input, routing, or map display. To cover specific use cases, navigation systems and applications may be required to filter and aggregate data from different building blocks, e.g. from both Routing and Map Display in order to calculate a route and show it to the user. Each update region may contain data from multiple building blocks. Within a product database, which has several update regions, there may thus be several instances of the same building block. Example: In a Europe product database, there may be a Basic Map Display building block in the update region "France" and a Basic Map Display building block in the update region "Germany".

== Tooling and documentation ==
The NDS standard is documented regarding database structures, interoperability requirements, and update processes. The NDS association provides various tools that can be used by the NDS members to develop and validate maps:

- NDS SQLite reference engine
- Relational DataScript (RDS tool): Code generator for database access classes in Java and C++
- Certification Bench: Validates NDS databases for compatibility based on detailed test cases and issues certificates
- Investigation Modules: Execution framework for testing NDS databases on target hardware
- Database Inspector: Desktop tool for visualizing NDS databases

== Members ==
The NDS association was founded in September 2008 as a German registered association (German: "Eingetragener Verein"). The NDS articles and the associated bylaws form the legal basis of the NDS association. As of October 2020, the NDS association has the following members:

- Aisin AW Co., Ltd
- Alps Alpine Electronics Inc.
- Autonavi Software Co, Ltd.
- Baidu Online Network Technology (Beijing) Co. Ltd.
- Bertrandt AG
- BMW AG
- Robert Bosch Car Multimedia GmbH
- Clarion
- Daimler AG
- DENSO Corporation
- Elektrobit Automotive GmbH
- EnGIS Technologies, Inc.
- Fiat Chrysler Automobiles
- Garmin Würzburg GmbH
- Harman
- Heading Data Intelligence
- HERE Technologies
- Hitachi
- Huawei
- Hyundai Motor Company
- INAVI
- Increment P Corporation
- Intellias
- Joynext
- Kuandeng
- Mapmaster (Toyota Mapmaster Inc.)
- Mappers Co. Ltd.
- Mitsubishi Electric Automotive Europe B.V.
- Mxnavi (Shenyang MXNavi Co. Ltd.)
- NavInfo Co., Ltd
- NAVIS Automotive Systems, Inc.
- Neusoft Technology Solutions GmbH
- Nissan Motor Co., Ltd.
- NNG Software Developing and Commercial LLC
- Pioneer
- Renault
- SK Telecom
- Telenav, Inc.
- Tencent
- TomTom Navigation B.V
- TRI-AD
- Volkswagen AG
- Zenrin Co., Ltd

== Internal structure ==
The members of the NDS association are legally established companies or bodies. NDS members nominate persons who represent the members in the respective bodies. NDS has the following bodies:

- Board: legal representative of the NDS association to the outside
- General Assembly (GA): Forum in which all NDS members are represented. The GA is responsible for supervising the work of all NDS bodies and for approving budget plans and membership fees on a yearly basis.
- Steering Committee (SC): responsible for all management issues
- Technical Committee (TC): responsible for technical issues
- Product Definition Group (PDG): responsible for defining the NDS products and roadmap
- NDS Working Groups (WG): deals with dedicated technical topics, such as map format development, autonomous driving, and cloud navigation
- Validation and Certification Board: coordinates the development of the validation tools and handles certification issues

== See also ==
- Automotive navigation system
- Map database management
