= OpenLR =

Open file format

- Developed by: TomTom
- Initial release: September 2009; 15 years ago
- Website: www.openlr.org

OpenLR is a royalty-free open standard for "procedures and formats for the encoding, transmission, and decoding of local data irrespective of the map" developed by TomTom.

== Specification ==
The format allows locations localised on one map to be found on another map to which the data have been transferred.

OpenLR requires that the coordinates are specified in the WGS 84 format and that route links are given in metres. Also, all routes need to be assigned to a "functional road class".

The specification is described in a white paper licensed under a Creative Commons license. Additionally, TomTom has published an open-source library for the format under the Apache license.

== TISA adaptations and ISO standard ==
The Traveller Information Services Association (TISA) adopted OpenLR for the TPEG2 standard, albeit with some modifications to align it with the conventions and principles of TPEG2. While functionally equivalent to the TomTom specification, the TISA adaptation differs in the XML structure and some field names (e.g. by use of the term properties where TomTom uses attributes); the binary format is also different. TISA’s version of the specification was subsequently adopted as ISO 21219-22:2017.

== Datex2 ==
OpenLR is one of multiple location referencing methods supported by Datex2. While functionally equivalent, the Datex2 adaptation of the format is not interoperable with either the TomTom or the TISA/ISO specification at the XML level.

== See also ==
- Traffic Message Channel
- GPS
- Point of Interest
