= Etak =

Defunct American mapping company

Etak, Inc. was an independent US-based vendor of automotive navigation system equipment, digital maps, and mapping software. It was founded in 1983. Competitor Navteq was founded in 1985.

Its original headquarters were in Sunnyvale, but the company later moved to 1430 O'Brien Drive (View on OpenStreetMap) in Menlo Park, California. The company finally ceased to exist under the name "Etak" shortly after its acquisition by Tele Atlas in 2000. In its time, it was a pioneer in commercializing automotive navigation systems and digital mapping, technologies that have since entered the mainstream.

== Founding of the company ==
Etak's initial start-up funding came from Nolan Bushnell, famous for starting Atari and Chuck E. Cheese's Pizza Time Theater.

[Co-founder Stan Honey] was doing military-related research at SRI International in 1983 when he sailed with Pong inventor and Atari founder Nolan Bushnell to victory in a Transpac race. Bushnell was impressed with Honey's navigational electronics and asked whether he had any other ideas. Honey suggested a car navigation system. Bushnell gave him $500,000 in seed money, and digital-mapping firm Etak (named after a Polynesian term for navigation) was born.

Etak's Navigator was the first commercially available automotive navigation system of any practical significance. Etak initially delivered the hardware system, the maps and dynamic content for its automotive navigation system.

Early Etak product literature claimed that "Etak" was an ancient Polynesian term that described navigating intuitively by the stars.

== Etak Navigator ==
Etak's initial product, the Navigator, was introduced in 1985. This system was the precursor to today's GPS-based automotive navigation systems, many of which trace a direct line of descent to Etak's technology.

The original Etak Navigator was a specially-packaged Intel 8088-based system with 256K RAM, 32K EPROM, 2K SRAM, and a cassette tape drive on which digital maps and some of the operating system were stored. The tapes could not hold much information, so for the Los Angeles area, for example, three to four tapes were required. When an edge of the map was reached, the driver needed to change cassette tapes to continue benefitting from the accuracy of map-matching. The system had a tape drive that was designed to be installed within easy reach of the driver, so this could be done while driving. The map moved on the screen as the car was driven, but instead of the color raster graphics display of today's systems it had a green vector display.

The Navigator featured address geocoding. It worked by using a digital compass mounted somewhere in the car (typically inside the headliner) and two wheel sensors mounted on the non-driven wheels (with magnetic strips installed on the wheel rims themselves). The system used map-matching augmented dead reckoning. The user entered the location of the car where it was first installed, and took it on a short calibration drive. From then on, the system self-corrected: error accumulated through dead reckoning could usually be reduced by checking to see whether the current location and direction of movement corresponded to a street in the map data. Because there was no GPS to provide an approximate absolute location, this was critically important.

== The move to digital mapping ==
The Navigator enjoyed a brief vogue, selling a few thousand units in a few years, and even finding its way to the dashboard of pop star Michael Jackson. It also appeared in a 1991 feature film "Nothing But Trouble", shown being used in a BMW by Chevy Chase and Demi Moore (albeit with a color display).

However, Etak did not have the financial resources for mass production of improved models of the Navigator. In 1985, Etak had entered into an exclusive agreement with General Motors, under which they would have to continue paying Etak a certain minimum amount regardless of whether GM's Delco Electronics division fielded a car navigation product.

Etak stopped making its own hardware and focused more on digital mapping technology with its Etak Maps and EtakGuide products. The transition away from automotive navigation engineering activities was gradual. Etak licensed its car navigation technology to other companies, notably Clarion in Japan, Bosch (Blaupunkt) in Germany (as the TravelPilot), as with Delco earlier. Etak continued to provide engineering support for the productization efforts of its licensees (except in the case of Delco, from which no product was forthcoming), and continued to develop and support vertical market fleet vehicle applications that used both the original Navigator and the TravelPilot as in-vehicle platforms.

As early as 1987, Etak was mapping Japanese cities. However, this was in an era of conflict between the U.S. and Japan in the automotive market. Japan had gotten an earlier start in car navigation efforts with Honda's Electro Gyrocator and other projects, but had not created a successful product. It has been argued that the Japanese government shielded its own manufacturers, and Etak might have been shut out in its mapping efforts even after having been allowed in. As reported in Fortune magazine in 1992:

[Etak] was the first to begin electronic mapping of Japanese cities in 1987, hoping to enable ambulance services and others to find addresses on computer screens. But a year later the government decided that Etak needed a license. By the time it came through, the company's head start was gone and a Japanese competitor had moved in.

Etak's acquisition (for a reported $25 million) by Rupert Murdoch's News Corporation marked a decisive change in emphasis. Murdoch had been persuaded that digital maps would be a major advertising medium, and Etak was arguably the leader in mapping the markets of major nations.

Sony Corporation in 1995 announced the Sony NVX-F160 system using Etak's digital mapping software. In April 1997, after Sony acquired Etak, Sony launched the "SkyMap" portable GPS system. Originally marketed to business travelers, SkyMap included two CD-ROMs (Eastern and Western US), a remote control, dashboard GPS antenna, and a PCMCIA card for laptops. Recreational-vehicle owners became a surprise market for the SkyMap product. Etak was involved in many web and mobile initiatives during the dotcom boom and partnered in the release of the first consumer internet-enabled location-based mobile applications.

== Expansion and consolidation ==
In 1995, News Corp expanded Etak's field operations unit to more quickly create accurate maps of major US cities. The majority of a second building at 1605 Adams Drive in Menlo Park (around the corner from the first building) was leased by Etak to house a map library, Sun SPARC digitizing stations, and field operations in early 1995. Prior to this, all national field operations were out of the Menlo Park office. Field offices, staffed by between 6 and 16 personnel, were opened in (in order of opening): Detroit, New York, Los Angeles, Seattle, Washington, D.C., Miami, Chicago, Houston, Atlanta and Orlando.

Starting in 1996, a highways project was started to capture geometry, geo-location, services, and navigation attributes along the interstate and federal and state highway systems. Under Sony's ownership, urban core projects were started in 1997 in Portland, Sacramento, Boston, New York, Las Vegas, San Diego, Dallas, San Antonio, Kansas City, Milwaukee, Cincinnati, Cleveland, Columbus, Philadelphia, Indianapolis, and Kokomo, Indiana, due to the agreement with GM's Delphi (formerly Delco) unit.

As the Etak map database was built (on old TIGER files) and updated, the field operations unit reassigned personnel to smaller satellite offices. The Miami field office, blocked by the Orlando office, was shuttered, and its personnel moved to Minneapolis, St. Louis, and Phoenix. In March 1998, the Chicago, Atlanta, Seattle, and Washington D.C. offices were closed, and headcount at remaining offices was reduced. On June 4, 1998, all remaining field offices were closed, marking the end of independent mapping efforts under the Etak banner.

== Acquisitions ==
Etak went through a number of acquisitions. Etak was acquired in 1989 by Rupert Murdoch's News Corporation. It was during this time that Fox Sports' FoxTrax hockey puck was introduced for use in NHL telecasts, using Etak GPS technology (there is a display in the Etak lobby). News Corporation then sold Etak to Sony Corporation in May 1996. In May 2000, Etak, Inc. was acquired from Sony Corporation by Tele Atlas and became Tele Atlas North America. Etak, Inc. ceased to exist as a separate company soon after.
