= AutoNavi =

Corporation of digital map content and navigation and location-based solutions

AutoNavi Holdings Limited

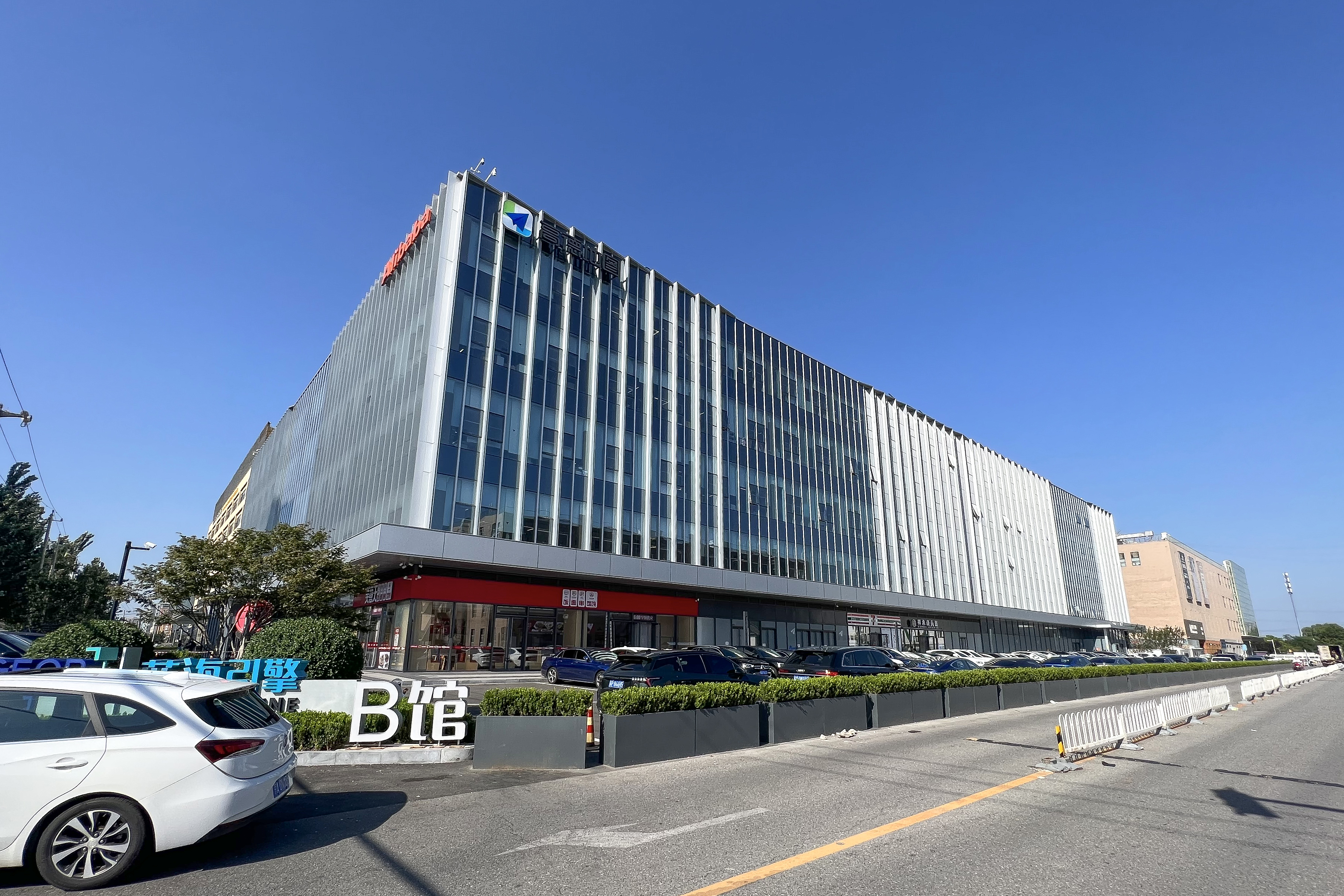
- Headquarters
- Type: Subsidiary
- Traded as: Nasdaq: AMAP
- Industry: Navigation; Location-based service
- Founded: 2001; 25 years ago
- Defunct: 11 April 2014
- Fate: Acquired
- Headquarters: Beijing
- Key people: Liu Zhenfei (Chairman); Guo Ning (CEO)
- Products: Electronic map
- Revenue: RMB 80,000,000
- Number of employees: 2,000s (2010)
- Parent: Alibaba Group
- Website: www.autonavi.com

AutoNavi
- Traditional Chinese: 高德軟件有限公司
- Simplified Chinese: 高德软件有限公司
Transcriptions
Standard Mandarin
- Hanyu Pinyin: Gāodé Ruǎnjiàn Yǒuxiàn Gōngsī

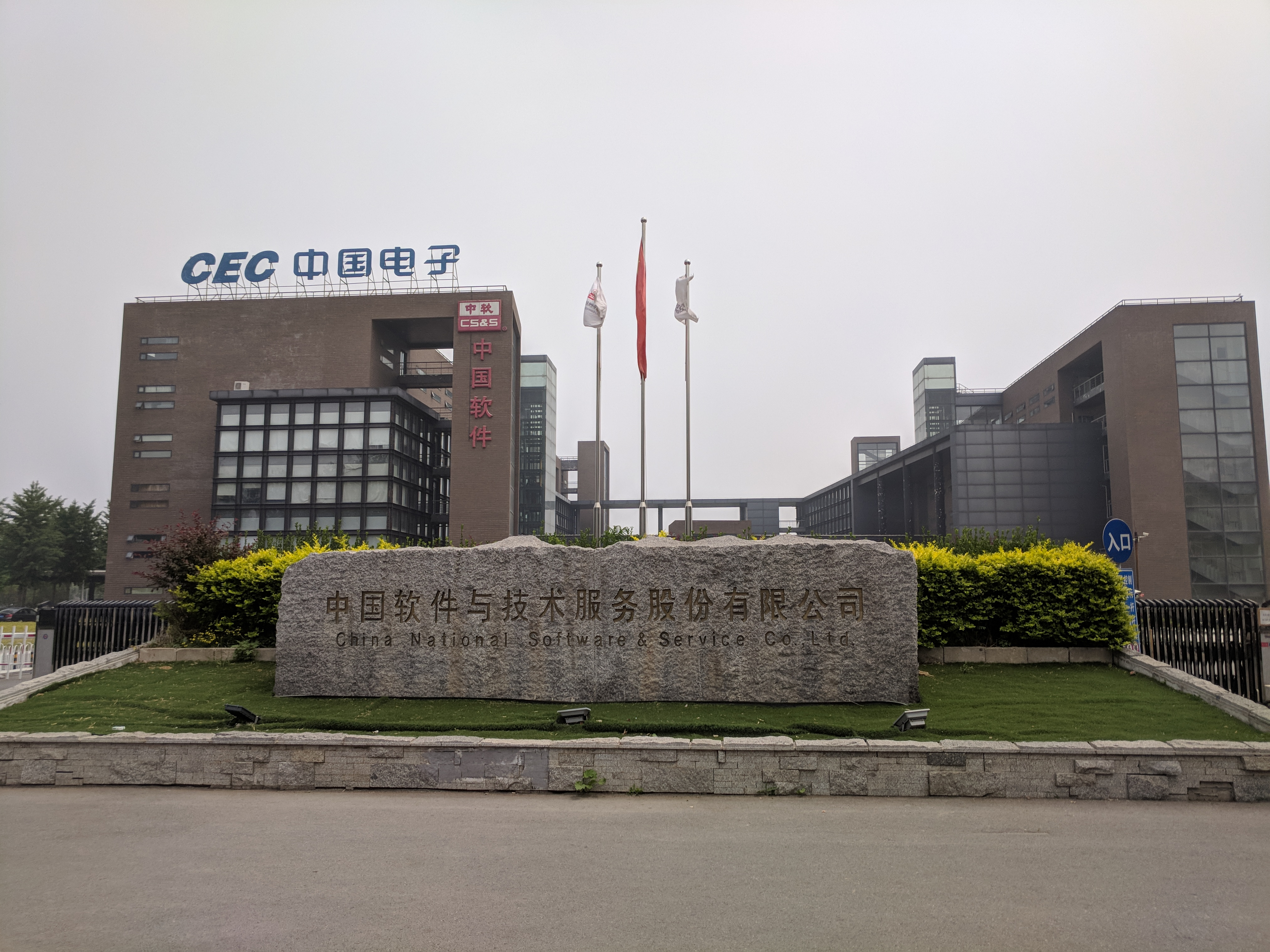
The data production base of AutoNavi Software Co., Ltd. in Changping District.

AutoNavi Software Co., Ltd. is a Chinese web mapping, navigation and location-based services provider, founded in 2001. One of its subsidiary companies, Beijing Mapabc Co. Ltd. , is a map website in China. AutoNavi was acquired by Alibaba Group in 2014. It offers its map services at Amap.com and as the Amap mobile app. It is known as Gaode in Chinese.

AutoNavi provides mapping data of China and Taiwan for Apple Maps, which was introduced with iOS 6. Previously this was the only method of viewing their map in English, and was only available when the Apple device was located within China. The app is available in English, traditional Chinese and simplified Chinese.

AutoNavi previously provided mapping data to Google from 2006, although this has not been updated for some years.

== History ==
The company was founded in 2002 by Jun Hou, Congwu Cheng and Jun Xiao "to develop digital map data for in-dash navigation systems in automobiles".

In 2007, Amap launched their first in-house developed car navigation system.

In 2021, Amap was integrated into Alibaba's Lifestyle Services division, which also includes food delivery service Ele.me.

In March 2023, Amap claimed 150 million average daily active users.

On 21 January 2025 the company launched an English version of their app for Android, iOS and HarmonyOS. This is China's first English map for overseas users. In 2026, an investigation of the app's network traffic found that Amap regularly transmits user location data to servers in China.

== See also ==
- List of online map services
- Google Maps
- TomTom
- Mapscape BV
- Mapbox
