= MiTAC =

Taiwanese electronics company

MiTAC International Corporation. 神達電腦股份有限公司
- Company type: Private
- Industry: Electronics
- Founded: 1982; 44 years ago
- Headquarters: Taiwan
- Key people: Matthew Miau (chairman); Billy Ho (corporate president)
- Products: Infotainment systems for automotive Automotive navigation system, Drive Video Recorder, Outdoor Navigator, Smart watch, Wearable computer, connected car solution
- Number of employees: 7000+
- Subsidiaries: Mio, Magellan, Navman
- Website: MiTAC Holding Corp. MiTAC Digital Technology Corp. B2B; B2C; Magellan US; Magellan Australia; Magellan New Zealand; Navman Australia Navman New Zealand

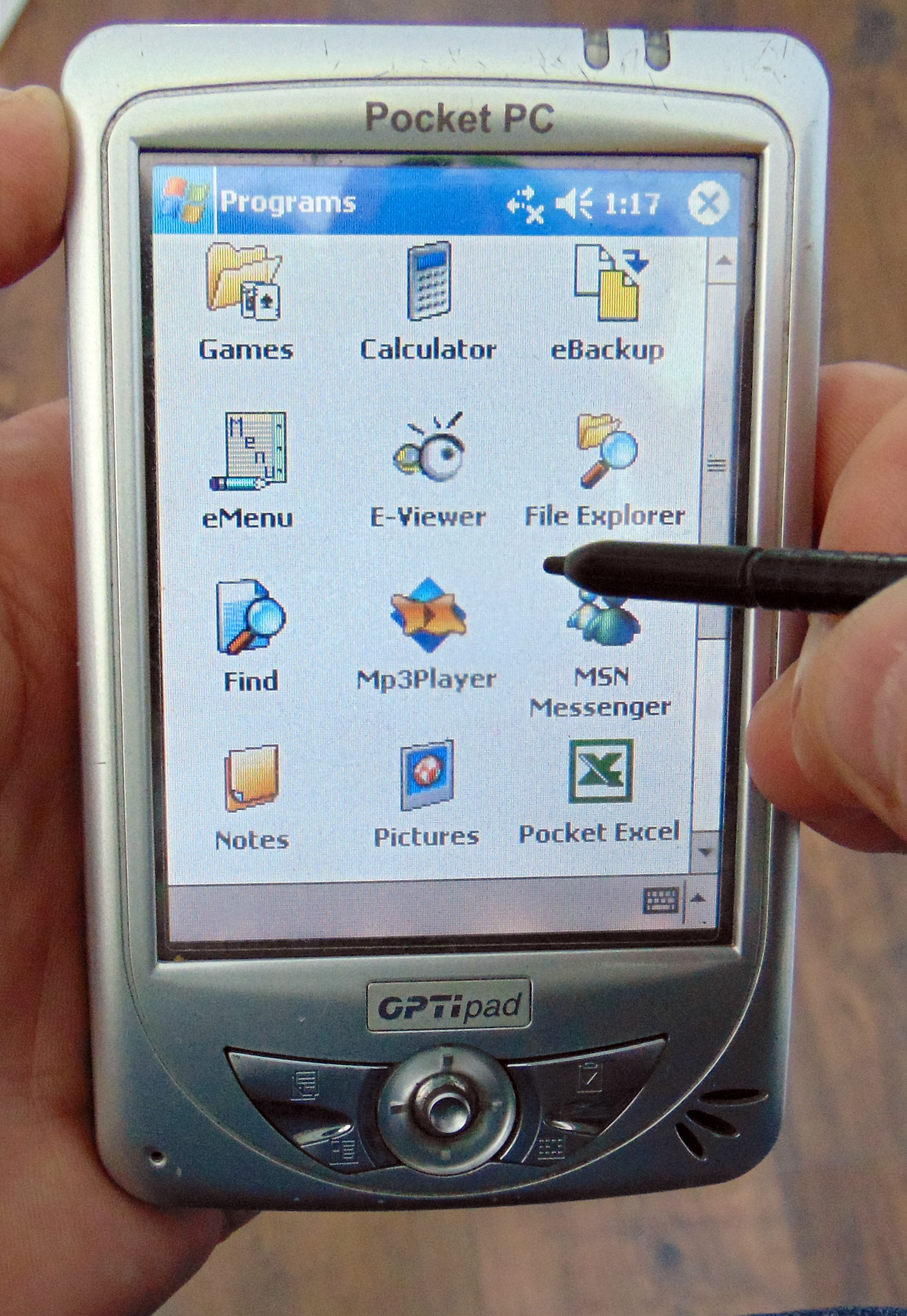
Mio 168 DigiWalker, Pocket PC

MiTAC Holdings Corporation, formerly MiTAC International Corp. (Chinese: 神達電腦股份有限公司) is a Taiwanese electronics company established 8 December 1982. It is a subsidiary of MiTAC-Synnex Group. Through a 100% stock swap from MiTAC International Corp., MiTAC Holdings Corp (神達投資控股) (TWSE: 3706) was established on 12 September 2013, and listed and traded on Taiwan Stock Exchange under code 3706.

Mitac's business of cloud computing business group, valued at about NT$3.4 billion (including assets, liabilities, related valuation items in shareholders' equity, and operations), was spun off and offered to the new MiTAC Computing Technology Corporation. MiTAC Computing Technology issued new shares as consideration to MiTAC Holdings. The transaction closing date of the spinoff was on 1 September 2014.

According to corporate president Billy Ho, Mitac withdrew from the PC industry in 2010 and has turned its focus on developing Internet of things (IoT) systems. This transformation resulted to the organization changed afterwards.

On 22 February 2007, MiTAC signed a definitive agreement to buy portable navigation device (PND) operations of the Navman brand from Brunswick Corporation.

MiTAC merged with Tyan Computer on 22 March 2007 for its server business. Therefore, MiTAC has not only OEM business for top-five server brands, but also TYAN focusing on value-added reseller and system integration market.

== Products ==
Mio

Infotainment systems for automotive OEMs, automotive navigation systems, drive video recorders, dashcams, connected car solutions, outdoor navigators, smart watches, wearable computers.

== History ==
MiTAC was founded in Hsinchu Science Park on 8 December 1982. By 1985 MiTAC was promoted as an independent computer brand.

MiTAC adopted SMT technology in 1989 and developed the world's fastest 80386-based personal computer with 286, 386, and 486-based products.

Officially listed on the Taiwan Stock Exchange from 1990 to 2013 (TWSE: 2315). From 12 September 2013 MiTAC Holdings Corporation was established and listed and traded on Taiwan Stock Exchange under stock code 3706.

In 1990, established MiTAC Technology (now called Getac) through a strategic alliance with General Electric of the US to specialize in the national defense and industrial notebook PCs.

In 1992, they quickened the pace of internationalization, expanding its production facilities in the UK, in order to meet demand in the European market. Listed as a Level-A vendor for environmental protection in an assessment of Taiwan's 500 largest manufacturers by the Environmental Protection Agency.

In 1993 MiTAC acquired American subsidiary and Compac (now Synnex Corporation), thereby increasing MiTAC International's competitiveness in the US market, and established subsidiaries in Mexico and New Zealand. MiTAC Shunde in China officially commenced operations.

MiTAC International signed a formal agreement with Compaq in 1995 to establish a strategic alliance. MiTAC International's US subsidiary Synnex successfully acquired well-known American distribution channel vendor ComputerLand in 1997.

Announced in 1999 the taking of a stake in well-known American computer motherboard design house Tyan, thereby entering the market for high-end motherboards.

In 2000, established MiTAC Computer (Shanghai) Ltd., MiTAC Computer (Kunshan) Ltd., and Shanghai MiTAC Research Ltd. to expand production and respond to strategic deployments.

In 2001, MiTAC International's US subsidiary Synnex USA completed the acquisition of all shares of Merisel Canada, Inc.

In 2002, MiTAC International Group celebrated the 20th anniversary of establishing its business operations headquarters in Taiwan. They bought Tyan Computer, a specialist in the design of high end motherboards and jointly established Y.S. Educational Foundation with member companies in the MiTAC-Synnex Group. Established the consumer brand Mio DigiWalker and announced the first ultra-slim PDA products.

In 2003, Synnex Corporation of the MiTAC Group listed on New York Stock Exchange (NYSE: SNX). Mio, a MiTAC independent brand, announced the world's first dual-band, dual-card PDA and smartphone; and the world's first PDA with built-in GPS: Mio 168.

In 2004, Commonwealth Publishing Co., Ltd. published "The 98/2 MiTAC Vitamin Plan", which won the Golden Book Award from SMEA of the Taiwan Ministry of Economic Affairs. Mio announced the first portable navigation product with built-in e-travel book. The shipping volume of navigation products commanded the world's third-largest.

In 2005, MiTAC incorporated Mio Technology Korea.

In 2005, MiTAC was ranked 67th in the World Top 100 High-tech Enterprises by Business Week, but dropped to 71st in 2006.

In 2007, MiTAC acquired the Navman trademark from the Brunswick Corporation, the related operating assets and liabilities (excluding cash) and the equipment of Navman Europe Ltd., Naviart Ltd., and Naviart Information Technology (Shanghai) Co. Ltd.

Incorporated Navman Technology Australia Pty Ltd. in Sydney, Australia and Navman Technology NZ Ltd. in Auckland, New Zealand.

They also acquired Tyan Computer Corporation. Mio was in the Top Three Handheld and Mobile GPS Navigation Devices in Q3 2007 (According to Canalys and IDC). MiTAC's high-level server products passed the Intel Qualified Server Board (IQSB) certification.

In 2008, signed on to be the Exclusive Global Positioning Equipment Senior Sponsor of the World Expo 2010. Purchased Magellan Navigation and the Consumer Satellite Navigator BU of its subsidiary to make Magellan one of the satellite navigator brands of MiTAC.

In 2009, established US subsidiary MiTAC Digital Corporation to expand the handheld GPS business to North America. Invested in Loyalty Founder Enterprise to enhance vertical integration capacity.

In 2010, purchased the system integration and assembly businesses from Synnex Corporation. Magellan launched the first outdoor GPS equipped with treasure finding games. MiTAC servers and storage devices were used at the World Expo 2010 Shanghai China. The first manufacturer to pass the ISO/IEC 20000 IT service process certification. Completed the world's first PND PCR (Personal Navigation Device Product Category Rule).

In 2011, MiTAC won a NT$70 million (US$2.22 million) contract to build one prototype “Radar Vehicle for Field Operation and Air Defense” for the National Chung-Shan Institute of Science and Technology. In 2015 police in Taoyuan took into custody three workers and one manager from MiTAC on charges of forgery of data and fabrication of test results. The tender required the vehicle to be able to advance at 8 km/h up a 40 degree incline, the vehicle MiTAC delivered could only advance at 6 km/h. Three NCSIST staff were detained on suspicion of colluding with the MiTAC employees to fabricate the test results, these staff then presented the fabricated results to their superiors for approval. The Taoyuan District Prosecutors’ Office began investigating after receiving a tip.

In 2012, MiTAC unveiled its first ARM processor-based servers and launched Mio Cyclo Series for cycling and fitness user.

In 2013, through a 100% stock swap from MiTAC International Corp., MiTAC Holdings Corporation was established on September 12 and listed and traded on Taiwan Stock Exchange under stock code 3706. At the same time, MiTAC International Corp. was delisted.

In 2014, MiTAC International Corp spun off the Cloud Computing Business Group to MiTAC Computing Technology Corp. (MCT) and MCT was formally established and operated on September 1.

In June 2025, Mitac Holdings announced that it had secured leases for two new production facilities in California, marking an expansion of its North American server-manufacturing operations. The move is attributed to a surge in demand for artificial-intelligence infrastructure, with the company describing North America as a key region for its server production capacity growth.

== See also ==
- List of companies of Taiwan
