= NavPix =

NavPix is the proprietary name applied by Navman to its technology that combines an image with geographical data.

The "NavPix" name is used for both the software and the geo-referenced image that results from that software.

== NavPix software ==
The NavPix technology enables users to take a JPEG image using the integrated digital camera on the N Series ("N" for NavPix), iCN 720 or iCN 750 portable Navman GPS navigation devices.

The Navman's GPS (Global Positioning System) receiver determines the latitude and longitude of where that image was taken. That information is then written into the image's Exif (Exchangeable image file format) meta data by the NavPix software. The NavPix, therefore, effectively provides a Georeference of the location where the image was taken, which is not necessarily the same georeference as the object being "NavPix-ed".

The NavPix image can then be used to define a destination or point of interest on compatible Navman devices.

== NavPix sources ==
Furthermore, as the geographical information is written to the meta data, the image itself can be shared between compatible devices or uploaded to Navman's NavPix Library which offers a wide range of NavPix images that have been taken by both Navman users and sourced from professional photo providers, including Lonely Planet.

The NavPix Library also enables people to upload non-NavPix images (including other formats such as GIF) and convert them to NavPix images by using entering either the latitude and longitude they want to associate with the image or by entering the address and using the Library's software to generate the latitude and longitude values based on a Postal code look-up.

Unlike some geo-referencing applications, the NavPix Library writes the georeference values to the image itself via the Exif meta data.

== Common Misconceptions ==
The photo taking abilities do not help navigation.

== See also ==
- GPS eXchange Format (XML schema for interchange of waypoints)
