= MiTAC Holdings =

MiTAC Holdings Corporation 神達控股股份有限公司
- Company type: Public
- Traded as: TWSE:3706
- Industry: Information technology, computer and peripheral equipment
- Founded: 12 September 2013
- Headquarters: No. 202, Wenhua 2nd Road, Guishan District, Taoyuan City 33383, Taiwan, R.O.C.
- Area served: Worldwide
- Key people: Matthew Miau (chairman); Billy Ho (corporate president)
- Revenue: ▲$35,536 million NTD (2023)
- Operating income: ▲$67 million NTD (2023)
- Net income: ▲$1,787 million NTD (2023)
- Total assets: ▲$88,752 million NTD (2023)
- Number of employees: 6,200
- Subsidiaries: MiTAC International Corp. MiTAC Computing Technology Corp. MiTAC Digital Technology Corp.
- Website: MiTAC Holdings

MiTAC Holdings Corporation, through its subsidiaries (MiTAC International Corp., MiTAC Computing Technology Corp. and MiTAC Digital Technology Corp.), provides GPS navigation devices, automotive solution, cloud services and cloud computing products worldwide. The company offers a range of electronics manufacturing services, such as research and development, design, manufacturing, assembly, marketing, and solutions. It also distributes portable car navigation products, outdoor handheld navigation devices, and mobile GPS solutions; and DashCam for vehicles, portable navigation devices for 4WD, and trucks under the Magellan, Mio, and Navman brand names. In addition, the company designs, manufactures, and markets x86 server/workstation platforms to OEMs, VARs, system integrators, and resellers under the TYAN brand name. Further, it offers storage products, cloud computing applications, all-in-one PC, thin client, and POS system, as well as smart wearable device and professional tablet series. MiTAC Holdings Corporation is based in Taipei, Taiwan.

== History ==
- 2013: Through a 100% stock swap from MiTAC International Corp., MiTAC Holdings Corporation was established on September 12 and listed and traded on Taiwan Stock Exchange under stock code 3706.
- 2014: MiTAC International Corp span off the Cloud Computing Business Group to MiTAC Computing Technology Corp.(MCT) and MCT was formally operated on September 1.
- 2018: MiTAC International Corp span off the Automotive and AIoT Business to MiTAC Digital Technology Corp.(MDT) and MDT was formally operated on January 1.

== Subsidiaries ==
- Asia: MiTAC International Corp. Lin Kou Office, MiTAC International Corp. Hsin-Chu Factory, MiTAC Computing Technology Corporation, MiTAC Digital Technology Corp., MiTAC Computer (Kunshan) CO., Ltd., MiTAC Computer (ShunDe) Ltd., MiTAC Research (Shanghai) Ltd., MiTAC Japan Corp., MiTAC Service (Shanghai) CO., Ltd
- USA: MiTAC Digital Corporation, MiTAC Information Systems Corp., Tyan Computer Corporation
- Europe: MiTAC Benelux N.V., MiTAC Europe Ltd., The Representative office of MiTAC Europe Ltd. in Moscow, Russian Federation, MiTAC Europe Ltd. Sp. z o.o. Oddzial w Polsce
- Oceania: MiTAC Australia Pty Ltd., Navman Technology NZ Ltd.

=== Investments ===
- US:Synnex - 9.8%
