= Navman =

- Type: Consumer Electronics
- Founded: 1986
- Headquarters: Gatwick, England
- Key people: Sir Peter Maire, Lionel Rogers
- Products: GPS systems
- Parent: MiTAC
- Website: www.navman.com

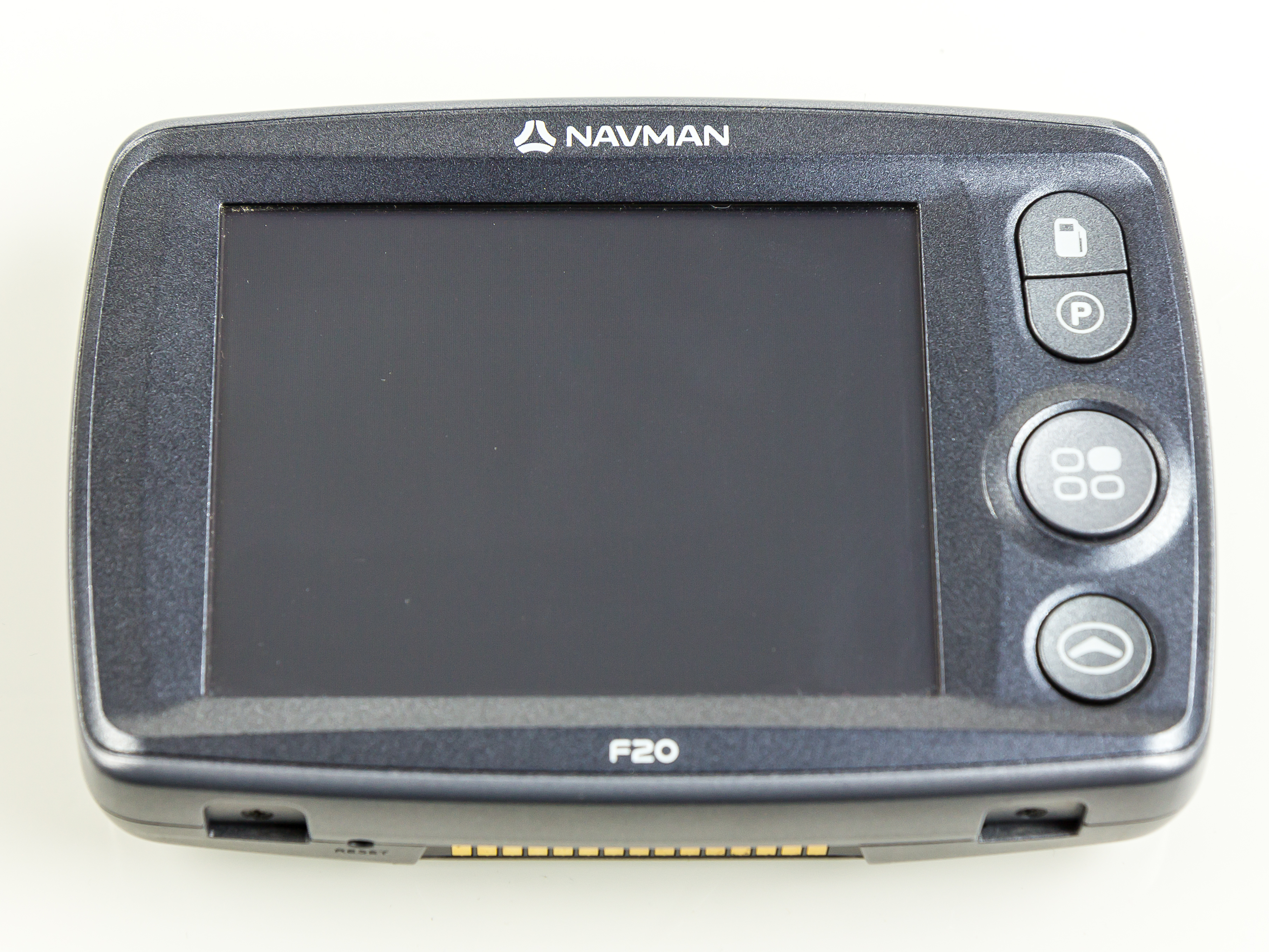
Navman F20

Established by Sir Peter Maire in 1986 as New Zealand-based Talon Technology, Navman (as the company became known in the 1990s) is a GPS systems company providing stand-alone GPS units, OEM GPS modules, GPS software for Palm handhelds and Pocket PCs, automotive navigation systems and navigation systems for use at sea. At its height as a New Zealand-owned company, Navman employed 300 staff at its headquarters in Auckland.

Navman was acquired by the Brunswick Corporation in June 2004 and became part of Brunswick New Technology. The company struggled to turn a profit, and a mass exodus of senior management staff ensued. The Navman Marine division, which designs and manufactures fish finders, sonar, VHF radios, autopilots, and sailing instruments, was sold by Brunswick to the Norwegian company Navico in April 2007. The Navman PND (Portable Navigation Device) division was sold to MiTAC in the first half of 2007. This business retains principal use of the Navman brand, including the navman.com website. Sales, marketing, and support are primarily based in Gatwick, England. Though market pressures and cutbacks meant, as of 2015, the now Taiwanese-owned company has just two staff in New Zealand, with operations now transferred to an Australian affiliate. Navman Wireless Vehicle Tracking Solutions and Navman Wireless OEM are the remaining Navman divisions. Brunswick sold these two businesses in a single management buy-out transaction in mid-2007. The company is doing business as Navman Wireless.

Navman-branded devices are still sold in Australia, New Zealand, and in key markets across Europe alongside devices from Mio.

Sister company Magellan also sells fitness and outdoor adventure GPS devices, including the Magellan Cyclo 100 series, Cyclo 500 series, Magellan Echo, Magellan Switch eXplorist GC, 110, 310, 510, 610, and 710.

== Navman Wireless ==
Navman Wireless was a global GPS-based technology and SaaS provider dedicated to developing better ways to capture and apply location, behavior, and diagnostic data from assets and people in real-time to pursue informed, intelligent, and profitable decisions.

In 2015, Navman wireless merged with Teletrac to form Teletrac Navman.

=== Navman Wireless OEM Solutions ===
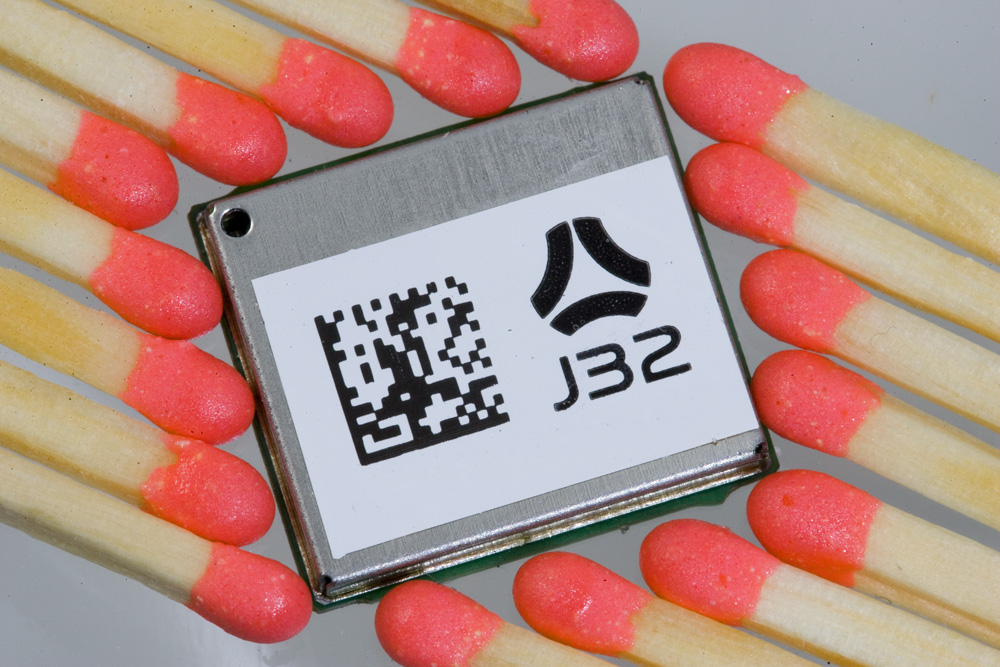
GPS receiver module made by Navman's OEM division.

Navman Wireless OEM Solutions was a division of Navman Wireless Holdings, a privately held company owned by independent investors and Prairie Capital Partners of Chicago. A leading designer and manufacturer of the Jupiter branded GPS modules, Navman Wireless OEM Solutions provides GPS modules, tracking devices and messaging terminals to thousands of companies worldwide for integration into their products and solutions. Its products are also compatible with OEM Data Deliveries Fuel Monitoring and Distribution control systems for heavy equipment. Navman Wireless OEM Solutions was sold to Telit in 2012.

== Navman PND ==
=== Software ===
Since the merging of Navman and Mio under MiTAC, the Navman SmartST application has been used by both Navman and Mio products.

SmartST v6 used version 1.40 of the low-level MapCore library and introduced a significantly different UI to the previous versions. In particular, it replaced up/down scrollbars with "glide touch" (also called "slide touch") scrolling, similar in concept to the iPhone. This approach, combined with a resistive touch screen, resulted in a number of usability complaints. As well as the UI changes, a number of new features were introduced such as 3D junction views, 3D landmarks, and advanced lane guidance.

SmartST v6.10 was released with the MY-series and used version 1.42 of MapCore. This version restored the option of the traditional up/down buttons in addition to the glide touch used in version 6.

SmartST v7 (with MapCore 1.50) The UI has changed, with a significant simplification of the main menu, and the removal of the "dockable windows" concept. This version also added a number of features over version 6.10:

- Time-sensitive routing, similar to TomTom's IQ Routes.
- Correct handling of Australian school zones, only alerting the driver when the zone is actually active.
- Landmark guidance ("In 200 metres at the petrol station turn right into Jones Street").

=== All-in-one devices ===
Currently, Navman devices are primarily marketed in Australia and New Zealand. Elsewhere, the devices are sold under the Mio label (though sometimes also sold as "Mio Navman" devices).

The EZY series was released in May 2010. All the devices run Windows CE 6.0, and SmartST 7.

Model	Screen size	TMC	Bluetooth	FM transmitter	Hardware model	RAM	Flash
EZY-30	3.5"	Add-on	No	No	?	64 MB	2 GB
EZY-40	4.3" widescreen	Add-on	No	No	?	64 MB	2 GB

The MY series was released in May 2009, with SmartST 6.10. All the devices run Windows CE 5.0.

Model	Screen size	TMC	Bluetooth	FM transmitter	Hardware model	RAM	Flash
MY-30	3.5"	Add-on	No	No	Seeker 300	64 MB	1 GB
MY-50 (New Zealand only)	4.7" widescreen	Add-on	DUN	No	Seeker 510	128 MB	1 GB
MY-50T (Australia only)	4.7" widescreen	Built in	DUN	No	Seeker T510	128 MB	1 GB
MY-55 (New Zealand only)	4.7" widescreen	Add-on	DUN + handsfree	Yes	Seeker T525	128 MB	2 GB
MY-55T (Australia only)	4.7" widescreen	Built in	DUN + handsfree	Yes	Seeker T525	128 MB	2 GB
MY-500XT	4.7" widescreen	Built in	DUN + handsfree	Yes	SeekerF T525	128 MB	2 GB

The MY-500XT has a capacitive touchscreen, compared to the resistive touchscreen in the other models. In July 2010, Navman announced the three additional models:

Model	Screen size	TMC	Bluetooth	FM transmitter	Hardware model	RAM	Flash
MY-60T	4.7" widescreen	Built in	No	No	?	?	?
MY-65T	4.7" widescreen	Built in	Yes	?	?	?	?
MY-75T	5.0" widescreen	Built in	Yes	?	?	?	?

==== Previous models ====
The Platinum S-series was primarily a hardware update of the normal S-series. The same version of SmartST is used on both the Platinum and original S-series.

Model	Screen size	TMC	Bluetooth	FM transmitter	Hardware model	RAM	Flash
S100	4.3" widescreen	Add-on	No	No	?	128 MB	1 GB
S150	4.3" widescreen	Add-on	DUN + handsfree	No	?	128 MB	1 GB
S200	4.3" widescreen	Add-on	DUN + handsfree	Yes	?	128 MB	1 GB
S300T (Australia only)	4.3" widescreen	Built in	DUN + handsfree	Yes	?	128 MB	1 GB

The S-series was released in September 2007, with the much-changed SmartST version 6. The flagship S90i model contained a built-in 2-megapixel camera for use with NavPix, something that has not reappeared on later flagship Navman devices.

Model	Screen size	TMC	Bluetooth	FM transmitter	Hardware model	RAM	Flash
S30	3.5"	Add-on	No	No	?	32 MB	256 MB
S35	3.5"	Add-on	No	No	?	64 MB	1 GB
S45 (Australia only)	4.3" widescreen	Add-on	No	No	?	64 MB	1 GB
S50	4.3" widescreen	Add-on	DUN + handsfree	No	?	64 MB	512 MB
S80 (Australia & U.K. only)	4.3" widescreen	Add-on	DUN + handsfree	No	?	96 MB	512 MB
S90i	4.3" widescreen	Built in	DUN + handsfree	No	?	96 MB	2 GB

June 2008: F-Series. The F15 is an entry level slim PND sold exclusively through RadioShack stores in the US. Key features of the F15: 3.5" Touch Screen, New UI based on the MioMaps GPS software by MiTAC owned Mio Technology, Maps of US and Puerto Rico, SiRFInstantFixII, and preloaded POIs. A version with a larger 4.3" screen, the F25 was sold in Europe, with a set of western Europe maps. Support from Navman/MiTAC was largely absent for this device.

January 2007: F-Series. The F30, F40 and F50 models were added. Based on the existing F20 unit, these new models were bundled with a variety of external modules to add new features out of the box. The F30 included a T1 traffic module to offer traffic (TMC) alerts. The F40 included a B2 module to offer Bluetooth handsfree calling. The F50 included a B2+ module offering both traffic (TMC) and Bluetooth.

2006: N-Series. Replacing the previous iCN 500 and iCN 700 series, the N40i and N60i are fully touch screen with nearest fuel and parking buttons and NavPix. The N60i was the top-range unit and has a wide, 4.3” screen. N-Series also had a third member, N20—intended as a replacement to 530 it suffered as the F20 cannibalised its sales.

2006: F20. Replacing the iCN 300 series, the F20 is small, fully touch screen and includes the nearest petrol and parking buttons. The F20 was essentially Navman's volume product, selling in great quantities, especially during the Christmas 2006 period.

In 2005, Navman replaced the 600 series with the 700 Series, consisting of the iCN 720 and iCN 750. The only difference between the two models was map storage—720 relied on memory cards while 750 had a 4 Gb built-in microdrive. It had a wide screen, was fully touch screen with no stylus, and included the nearest petrol and parking buttons. It was the first Navman unit with NavPix. Upon introduction of the 700 series, support was dropped for the 600 series essentially rendering the 600 series obsolete as there would be no additional map updates or product support available.

The original top-range units were those of the 600 Series. These are larger than the 300 and 500 units, offering louder sound and a wider, automotive grade screen. They are not touch screen but are known for being strong and easy to see. The 600 units are the 610, 620, 630, 635 and 650. The 650 came with a built-in 2 GB microdrive and was also OEMed for Delphi and Sony.

The 500 Series was originally the middle of Navman’s range. It includes the iCN 510, 520, 530 and 550. They are touchscreen and are usually operated with a stylus. The 550 introduced Navman’s unique nearest petrol and parking buttons, worldwide maps and real-time traffic updates. 530 was the last in the 500 Series introducing hardware styling later found on N-Series.

The 300 Series is Navman’s original range of basic, in-car satellite navigation units. It includes the iCN (in-car navigator) 320 and 330. The 320 introduced 2D moving maps, while the 330 had 3D moving maps.

Navman has also made a number of Pocket PCs in the past, known as the PiN Series, running from the PiN 200/

Pin 300 to 570. They were not popular, however, and have long since been discontinued.

=== TMC ===
The TMC Accessory Kit equips the Navman S30 3D with TMC (Traffic Message Channel, this is, traffic alerts & re-routing). The MY TMC is for Navman MY30. S Series Platinum TMC Accessory Kit is compatible with the latest Platinum range S100/150/200 & the Classic S45 and S35.

The MY30, MY50T, MY55T, MY500XT, S300T, S200, S150, S100, S45, S35, S90i, S80, S30 and S50 have TMC built in.

=== NavPix ===
Navman introduced "NavPix" on its iCN 700 portable navigation devices in 2006. Navman was the first company worldwide to introduce NavPix (on which they hold a patent). The NavPix technology combines a digital image with geographical data to create the NavPix image, which is a record of the exact location where that image was taken. The iCN 720 and iCN 750 were the first Navman GPS products that were NavPix-enabled, using a 1.3 MegaPixel camera to take the NavPix.

NavPix was developed to offer users an alternative way to navigate, by selecting an image rather than entering an address or post code.

The N Series – N for NavPix – products launched in September 2006, introduced two more NavPix-enabled products – the N40i and wide-screen N60i, both of which had an integrated digital camera to take the NavPix. The N20 model can use NavPix images, but not take them.

The NavPix image contains the latitude and longitude information within the Exif metadata. These images can be selected on the compatible Navman as an alternative way to define a destination or waypoint when planning a route.

The latest Navman sat nav, the S90i offers a 2.0 MegaPixel camera for taking NavPix. Other S-Series models, the S50 and S70, are NavPix compatible meaning NavPix images can be loaded onto the device for use.

NavPix images may be freely accessed from the Navman NavPix Library as well as other sites such as Flickr.

== Navman Marine ==
Navman's Marine Division was acquired by Navico, the world's largest marine electronics company, and is the parent company to leading marine electronics brands: Lowrance, Simrad and B&G. Navico has approximately 1,500 employees globally and distribution in more than 100 countries worldwide. The original core technology and product research and development centre that was Navman remains today intact in the Auckland, New Zealand operation. This is where a number of next generation product platforms are developed and launched for use across the B&G, Lowrance, and Simrad brands.

The Navman brand was discontinued after a period of time in favour of the North American favoured Northstar brand.
