= Navigation system =

Electronic navigational aid

A navigation system is a computing system that aids in navigation. Navigation systems may be entirely on board the vehicle or vessel that the system is controlling (for example, on the ship's bridge) or located elsewhere, making use of radio or other signal transmission to control the vehicle or vessel. In some cases, a combination of these methods is used.

Navigation systems may be capable of one or more of:

- containing maps, which may be displayed in human-readable format via text or in a graphical format
- determining a vehicle or vessel's location via sensors, maps, or information from external sources
- providing suggested directions to a human in charge of a vehicle or vessel via text or speech
- providing directions directly to an autonomous vehicle such as a robotic probe or guided missile
- providing information on nearby vehicles or vessels, or other hazards or obstacles
- providing information on traffic conditions and suggesting alternative directions
- simultaneous localization and mapping
- acoustic positioning for underwater navigation

The first in-car navigation system available to consumers in 1985 was called Etak Navigation. The company, Etak, was led by engineer Stan Honey and incubated by Nolan Bushnell's Catalyst Technologies in Silicon Valley. Etak held a number of patents and produced digitized maps for the navigation system. The maps were streamed to the navigation system from special tape cassettes. The early digitized maps turned out to be more valuable than the navigation system. The car icon used in Etak Navigation display was a vector-based graphic based on Atari, Inc.'s Asteroids spaceship.

== Types of navigation systems ==
- Automotive navigation system
- Marine navigation systems using sonar
- Satellite navigation system
  - Global Positioning System, a group of satellites and computers that can provide information on any person, vessel, or vehicle's location via a GPS receiver
    - GPS navigation device, a device that can receive GPS signals for the purpose of determining the device's location and possibly to suggest or give directions
  - GLONASS, satellite navigation system run by Russia
  - Galileo global navigation satellite system
  - IRNSS, regional satellite system run by India.
- Surgical navigation system, a system that determines the position of surgical instruments in relation to patient images such as CT or MRI scans.
- Inertial guidance system, a system which continuously determines the position, orientation, and velocity (direction and speed of movement) of a moving object without the need for external reference
- Robotic mapping, the methods and equipment by which an autonomous robot is able to construct (or use) a map or floor plan and to localize itself within it
- XNAV for deep space navigation

== See also ==
- Positioning system
- Guidance, navigation and control
- Guidance system
