= Electronic Route Guidance System =

Electronic Route Guidance System (ERGS) was an American government-sponsored in-vehicle navigation and guidance system developed by the United States Federal Highway Association in the 1970s. ERGS was the initial stage of a larger research and development effort called the Intelligent Transportation System (ITS).

ERGS was a destination-oriented system that required a human driver to enter a destination code into the vehicle system. The vehicle communicated with an instrument intersection where the destination code was decoded, and routing information was sent back to the vehicle.

A similar program was Japan's Comprehensive Automobile Traffic Control System (CACS), developed by the National Institute of Advanced Industrial Science and Technology and the Ministry of International Trade and Industry and fielded from 1973 to 1979, which used radio frequency communication methods. Similar projects were also developed in Europe. These early route guidance programs all used central processing systems with large central computers.
