= Tele Atlas =

Dutch mapping company

Tele Atlas NV
- Type: Wholly owned subsidiary
- Industry: Geographic information systems
- Founded: 1984
- Headquarters: 's-Hertogenbosch, Netherlands (corporate); Ghent, Belgium (operational)
- Products: Digital mapping data
- Revenue: €308.0 million (2007)
- Operating income: ▲€25.0 million (2007)
- Net income: ▲€24.4 million (2007)
- Number of employees: 1,889 (2007)
- Parent: TomTom
- Website: tomtom.com

Tele Atlas is a Netherlands-based company founded in 1984 which delivers digital maps and other dynamic content for navigation and location-based services, including personal and in-car navigation systems, and provides data used in a wide range of mobile and Internet map applications. Since 30 July 2008, the company has been a wholly owned subsidiary of automotive navigation system manufacturer TomTom.

== Operations ==
The company provides maps, some sourced from other mapping companies, covering two hundred countries around the world, providing mapping data and "Map Enhancement Products" such as points of interest and address points. Clients of Tele Atlas include makers of automotive navigation systems as well as mobile and internet companies which provide mapping services. The firm also supplies data to clients in the public and private sectors who rely on geographic information.

== Mapping vans ==
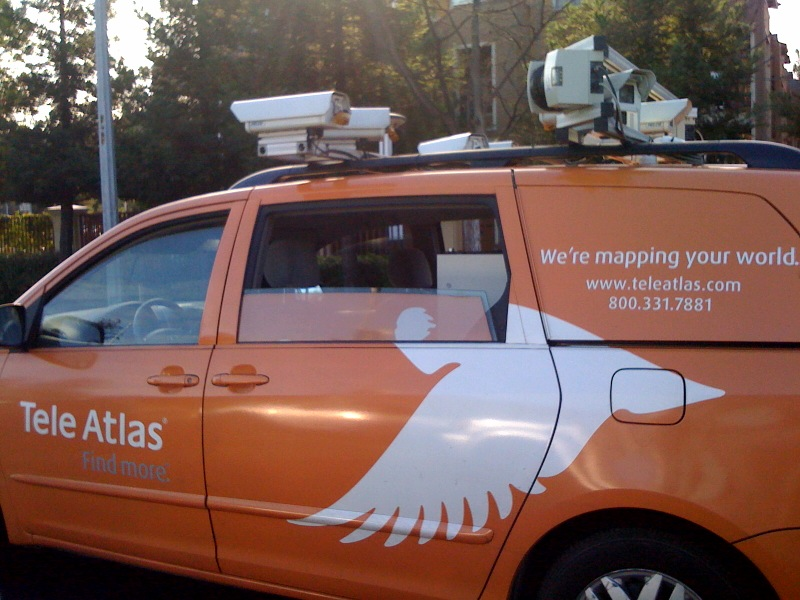
Mapper van with cameras visible on the top of the vehicle and the hard drives cabinet in the customized rear seat.

The company keeps its data up-to-date in part through a fleet of dozens of mapping vans equipped with "six cameras, two side-sweeping lasers and a GPS navigation device." The vans capture about three photos per second while traveling at normal speeds, resulting in more than 100 million images per year from each van; the images are stored on one of two hard disk drives within a metal cabinet inside the van, drives that hold about two weeks of data. Meanwhile, the 3-D scanning lasers record the width, height and contours of the first reflective surface they encounter, producing data that when combined with the images create a three-dimension representation. Three-dimension representations are already available in Japan and Western Europe; employees at the company's U.S. headquarters in Lebanon, New Hampshire, near Dartmouth College, expected in August 2009 that by the beginning of 2011, devices based on Tele Atlas data would be able to depict the surroundings in photo-realistic detail.

== Map error handling ==
Map errors are handled using Tele Atlas Map Insight, described as "our consumer map feedback and change reporting system". The idea is to let end users report errors directly to Tele Atlas, not via the technical support of the manufacturers of products using Tele Atlas maps, and thereby reducing support costs. Map errors are reported using the Tele Atlas Map Insight map feedback web page, to which there can be links from the supports pages of the products. Company is provided the 25% quality in their geospatial database.

== Acquisitions ==
=== Etak ===
In May 2000, Tele Atlas acquired Etak, Inc., a United States-based vendor of automotive navigation system equipment, digital maps, and mapping software, from Sony Corporation, which became Tele Atlas North America. Etak, Inc. ceased to exist as a separate company soon after.

=== GDT ===
On 29 April, 2004, Tele Atlas acquired GDT (Geographic Data Technology, Inc.), a digital map supplier in New Hampshire.

=== TomTom ===
On 23 July 2007, a €2 billion offer for the company by navigation system maker TomTom was accepted by the Tele Atlas board. This was then trumped by a €2.3 billion offer from US-based rival Garmin on 31 October 2007 initiating a bidding war for Tele Atlas. TomTom responded by upping their bid to €2.9 billion, an offer which was again approved by the board of Tele Atlas. Garmin had been expected to counterbid once again: with Tele Atlas' main global rival Navteq subject to a takeover bid from Nokia, the company had stated that it did not wish both companies to fall into the hands of rivals. However, after striking a content agreement with Navteq through the year 2015, Garmin withdrew its takeover offer, clearing the way for TomTom. On 4 December 2007, TomTom shareholders approved the takeover. The European Commissioner for Competition cleared the takeover in May 2008, and it closed in June.

== Internet mapping agreements ==
Historically, Internet mapping providers have utilized map data from a variety of vendors. Given the growth in usage of Internet mapping portals, the map suppliers have competed fiercely for that business.

On 30 June 2008, Tele Atlas announced a five-year agreement to continue to supply data to Google Maps. Under the deal, Tele Atlas was to have access to corrections and updates to the data made by the Google Maps community. Roughly a year later, in October 2009, Google discontinued using Tele Atlas maps in the United States and began collecting map feedback from consumers for their own use. Shortly thereafter, Google announced Google Maps Navigation for Android, which provides turn-by-turn navigation, similar to the functionality provided by TomTom devices, for free as part of Android.

In May 2008, Mapquest announced that it had expanded its agreement with Navteq to use Navteq map data in 73 countries. In January 2009, Microsoft announced that it had expanded its agreement with Navteq to utilize its map data for 74 countries, in addition to licensing a variety of additional content. As a result, consumers in the Internet segment are likely to be exposed to Tele Atlas data less frequently.

== See also ==
- Map database management
