= Tyan =

Taiwanese computer motherboard manufacturer

Tyan Computer Corporation
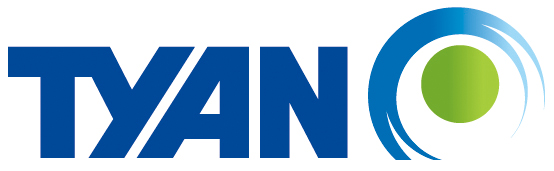
- Company type: Private (3480, OTC-TW)
- Industry: Computers; Consulting; Servers; Storage
- Founded: 1989
- Founder: Dr. T. Symon Chang
- Headquarters: Taipei, Taiwan
- Key people: Dr. T. Symon Chang, former CEO and President; Dr. James Sytwu, former General Manager and Head of Engineering; Mr. Sander Chang, former Vice-President of Operations; Ms. Teresa Chen, former Vice-President of Finance and Controller; Mr. Danny Hsu, Vice-President of Tyan Business Unit (TBU)
- Products: Motherboards; Servers
- Number of employees: est. 250 worldwide (2007)
- Website: www.tyan.com

Tyan Computer Corporation (泰安電腦科技股份有限公司; also known as Tyan Business Unit, or TBU) is a subsidiary of MiTAC International, and a manufacturer of computer motherboards, including models for both AMD and Intel processors. They develop and produce high-end server, SMP, and desktop barebones systems as well as provide design and production services to tier 1 global OEMs, and a number of other regional OEMs.

== Founding ==
The company was founded in 1989 by Dr. T. Symon Chang, a veteran of IBM and Intel. At that time, Dr. Chang saw an empty space in the market in which there were no strong players for the SMP server space, and as such he founded Tyan in order to develop, produce and deliver such products, starting with a dual Intel Pentium-series motherboard as well as a number of other single processor motherboards all geared towards server applications.

Since then, Tyan has produced a number of single and multi-processor (as well as multi-core) products using technology from many well-known companies (e.g. Intel, AMD, NVIDIA, Broadcom and many more). Notable design wins include that of Dawning corporation for the fastest supercomputer (twice); first to market with a dual AMD Athlon MP server platform; winner of the Maximum PC Kick-Ass Award (twice) for their contributions to the Dream Machine (most recently, the 2005 edition); and first to market with an eight (8) GPU server platform (the FT72-B7015).

== Later company history ==
Tyan is headquartered in Taipei, Taiwan, separated between three buildings in the Nei-Hu industrial district. All three buildings belong to the parent company, MiTAC. The North American headquarter is in Newark, California, which is the same North American headquarter for MiTAC.

The merger in question was with MiTAC, a Taiwanese OEM which develops and produces a range of products (including servers, notebooks, consumer electronics products, networking and educational products - as well as providing contract manufacturing services), was announced in March 2007 and completed on October 1 of that year. Under the umbrella of MiTAC, Tyan acts as the brand leader and core engineering and marketing arm for delivery of server and workstation products to the distribution and reseller channel, and continues to act as a design and production services house for OEM customers.

MiTAC International Corp. spun off the Cloud Computing Business Group to the newly incorporated MiTAC Computing Technology Corporation on 1 September 2014. TYAN is a leading server brand of MiTAC Computing Technology Corp. under the MiTAC Group.

TYAN launched the first OpenPOWER reference system based on the IBM POWER8 architecture in Oct 2014. TYAN is one of the founding members of the OpenPOWER Foundation, which was established in 2013.
