= Point of interest =

Useful location marked on maps

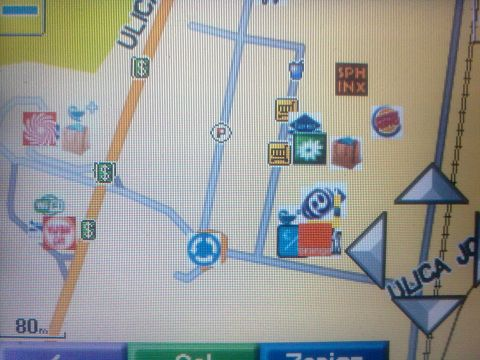
Viewing POI points on a Garmin GPS

A point of interest (POI) is a specific point location that someone may find useful or interesting. An example is a point on the Earth representing the location of the Eiffel Tower, or a point on Mars representing the location of its highest mountain, Olympus Mons. Most consumers use the term when referring to hotels, campsites, fuel stations or any other categories used in modern automotive navigation systems.

Users of a mobile device can be provided with geolocation and time-aware POI service that recommends geolocations nearby and with a temporal relevance (e.g. POI to special services in a ski resort are available only in winter).

The term is widely used in cartography, especially in electronic variants including GIS, and GPS navigation software. In this context the synonym waypoint is common.

A GPS point of interest specifies, at minimum, the latitude and longitude of the POI, assuming a certain map datum. A name or description for the POI is usually included, and other information such as altitude or a telephone number may also be attached. GPS applications typically use icons to graphically represent different categories of POI on a map.

A region of interest (ROI) and a volume of interest (VOI) are similar in concept, denoting a region or a volume (which may contain various individual POIs).

In medical fields such as histology, pathology, and histopathology, points of interest are selected from the general background in a field of view; for example, among hundreds of normal cells, the pathologist may find 3 or 4 neoplastic cells that stand out from the others upon staining.

== POI collections ==
Custom speed camera POI overlaid on a BMW navigation map

Digital maps for modern GPS devices typically include a basic selection of POI for the map area.

However, websites exist that specialize in the collection, verification, management and distribution of POI which end-users can load onto their devices to replace or supplement the existing POI. While some of these websites are generic, and will collect and categorize POI for any interest, others are more specialized in a particular category (such as speed cameras) or GPS device (e.g. TomTom/Garmin). End-users also have the ability to create their own custom collections.

Commercial POI collections, especially those that ship with digital maps, or that are sold on a subscription basis are usually protected by copyright. However, there are also many websites from which royalty-free POI collections can be obtained, e.g. SPOI - Smart Points of Interest, which is distributed under ODbL license.

== Applications ==
The applications for POI are extensive. As GPS-enabled devices as well as software applications that use digital maps become more available, so too the applications for POI are also expanding. Newer digital cameras for example can automatically tag a photograph using Exif with the GPS location where a picture was taken; these pictures can then be overlaid as POI on a digital map or satellite image such as Google Earth. Geocaching applications are built around POI collections. In vehicle tracking systems, POIs are used to mark destination points and/or offices to that users of GPS tracking software would easily monitor position of vehicles according to POIs.

== File formats ==
Many different file formats, including proprietary formats, are used to store point of interest data, even where the same underlying WGS84 system is used.

Reasons for variations to store the same data include:

- A lack of standards in this area (GPX is a notable attempt to address this).
- Attempts by some software vendors to protect their data through obfuscation.
- Licensing issues that prevent companies from using competitor's file specifications.
- Memory saving, for example, by converting floating point latitude and longitude co-ordinates into smaller integer values.
- Speed and battery life (operations using integer latitude and longitude values are less CPU-intensive than those that use floating point values).
- Requirements to add custom fields to the data.
- Use of older reference systems that predate GPS (for example UTM or the British national grid reference system)
- Readability/possibility to edit (plain text files are human-readable and may be edited)

The following are some of the file formats used by different vendors and devices to exchange POI (and in some cases, also navigation tracks):

- ASCII Text (.asc .txt .csv .plt)
- Topografix GPX (.gpx)
- Garmin Mapsource (.gdb)
- Google Earth Keyhole Markup Language (.kml .kmz)
- Pocket Street Pushpins (.psp)
- Maptech Marks (.msf)
- Maptech Waypoint (.mxf)
- Microsoft MapPoint Pushpin (.csv)
- OziExplorer (.wpt)
- TomTom Overlay (.ov2) and TomTom plain text format (.asc)
- OpenStreetMap data (.osm)

Third party and vendor-supplied utilities are available to convert point of interest data between different formats to allow them to be exchanged between otherwise incompatible GPS devices or systems. Furthermore, many applications will support the generic ASCII text file format, although this format is more prone to error due to its loose structure as well as the many ways in which GPS co-ordinates can be represented (e.g. decimal vs degree/minute/second). POI format converters are often named after the POI file format they convert and convert to, such as KML2GPX (converts KML to GPX) and KML2OV2 (converts KML to OV2).

== See also ==
- Automotive navigation system
- Geocoded photograph
- Map database management
- OpenLR
- Photogrammetry
- Site of Special Scientific Interest
- Tourist attraction
- World Geodetic System (used to represent GPS co-ordinates)
- ⌘, a symbol sometimes used to indicate points of interest
