= Navteq =

Former provider of electronic navigable maps

Coordinates: 41°53′3.9″N 87°38′21.1″W

Navteq Corporation
- Type: Public
- Traded as: NYSE: NVT (2004–2008)
- Industry: GPS data and services, navigation software
- Founded: 1985 (Karlin & Collins, Inc.); 1987 (Navigation Technologies Corporation); 2004 (NAVTEQ)
- Founders: Barry Karlin; Galen Collins
- Defunct: 2011 (replaced by Nokia Here)
- Fate: Merged into parent Nokia to become Nokia Here
- Headquarters: Chicago, Illinois, United States,
- Key people: Michael Halbherr, EVP
- Number of employees: 5,500 (2012)
- Parent: Here
- Website: navteq.com (archived)

Navteq Corporation (styled as 'NAVTEQ') was an American Chicago-based provider of geographic information system (GIS) data and a major provider of base electronic navigable maps. The company was acquired by Nokia in 2007–2008, and fully merged into Nokia in 2011 to form part of the Here business unit. The unit was subsequently sold to a consortium of German auto makers in 2016.

== Overview ==
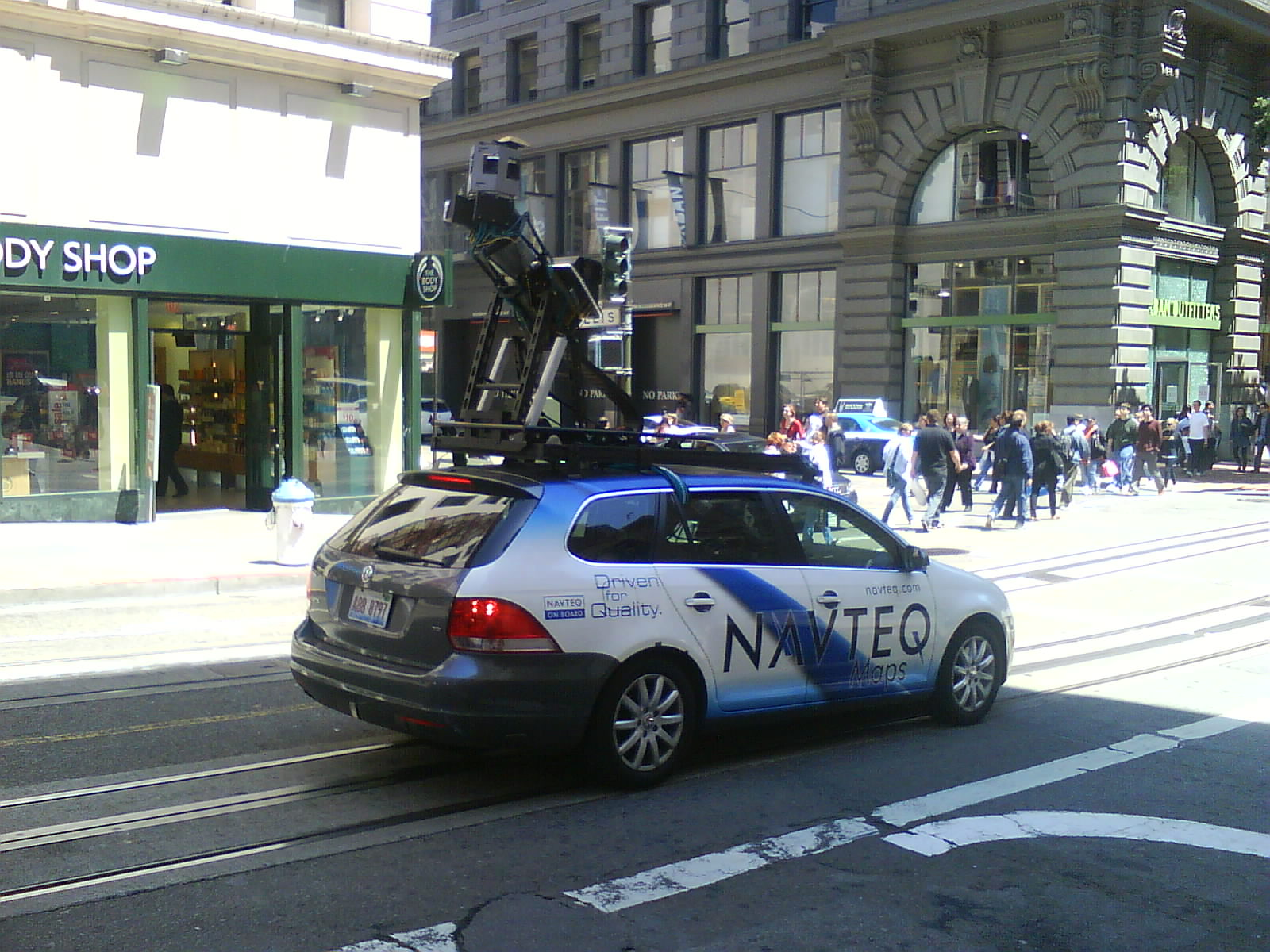
A Navteq car surveying on Powell Street, San Francisco

Navteq's underlying map database is based on first-hand observation of geographic features rather than relying on official government maps. It provides data used in a wide range of applications, including automotive navigation systems for many car makers, accounting for around 85% of market share. Most clients use Navteq to provide traffic reports in major metropolitan areas throughout North America.

Navteq partners with third-party agencies and companies to provide its services for portable GPS devices made by Garmin, Lowrance, NDrive and web-based applications such as Yahoo! Maps, Bing Maps, and Nokia Maps. Microsoft's aviation game Flight Simulator X uses Navteq data to achieve a high level of visual realism for automatic terrain generation. XM Satellite Radio and Sirius Satellite Radio use Navteq data to show traffic information on navigation systems. Navteq data has also been used for GPS- and GSM-based sex offender tracking systems in North Carolina and Georgia. Navteq also provides graphics systems, information services, and personnel for TV and radio broadcasting via Navteq Media Services.

Its main competitor was the Dutch company TeleAtlas now owned by TomTom.

== Map error handling ==
Map errors are handled using Navteq Map Reporter, which is described as a "community-based online tool for suggesting changes to the Navteq map". The Navteq Map Reporter's API makes it possible for manufacturers of devices using Navteq maps to build in error reporting features into their products.

== History ==
=== Karlin & Collins, Inc. ===
The company was founded in 1985 by Barry Karlin and Galen Collins. Karlin, originally from South Africa, told interviewers that he started the company after being frustrated with a paper map of the San Francisco, California area. He thought 'Wouldn't it be nice if I had someone sitting next to me in the car who knew the way?' Collins created a pilot navigation system in the San Francisco area. However, basic testing showed the system could generate impossible directions. They realized that the system not only had to have accurate maps, but also detailed data on turn restrictions, one-way streets and other local issues.

They were turned down by most venture capital firms in their attempts to finance the database but the president of Budget Rent A Car suggested they ask T. Russell Shields, a Chicago entrepreneur and founder of Shields Enterprises International, which specialized in building order fulfillment databases. Shields provided US$500,000 in seed money.

In 1985, Karlin & Collins, Inc., based in Sunnyvale, California, began comprehensive mapping of the San Francisco Bay Area getting another US$2.5 million from Prudential Bache. Karlin and Collins made use of the newly created U.S. Census electronic map (TIGER files) which was matched with aerial photographs. They hired people to drive every road carrying a Dictaphone describing the position. In lieu of using a GPS, they kept track of the location of the vehicle using a dead reckoning system that relied on a gyro compass.

In 1987, they unveiled their first product, DriverGuide, which was a countertop kiosk installed at car rental agencies and hotel lobbies and printed door-to-door driving directions. They later produced a coin-operated kiosk charging 50 cents. A total of 80 machines worth US$12,000 were installed around the San Francisco Bay Area and were a success. Shields invested another $3 million on condition he be named chief operating officer. The company was renamed Navigation Technologies Corporation.

A competitive environment was quickly arising with Etak being the most notable. Etak's offering was an in-car system that showed your location on the map but did not offer directions.

=== Navigation Technologies Corporation (NavTech) ===
In the 1990s, the company changed its business model so that instead of building kiosks itself, it licensed its maps to be used by other hardware makers. Philips Electronics acquired the company in the early 1990s and invested nearly US$600 million in building the database for a car-based mapping device. Both Karlin and Collins left after the takeover but Shields remained, rising to chief executive officer in 1996.

=== Navteq ===
Philips on several occasions tried to take the company public but backed off each time until finally going public in February 2004. The company was listed on the New York Stock Exchange (NYSE) under the ticker symbol "NVT". The company render their name as 'NAVTEQ', in all capitals.

Navteq is headquartered in Chicago, Illinois with more than 5,500 employees worldwide working in 202 offices in 53 countries, including regional headquarters in Veldhoven, Netherlands and Singapore. It also owns and operates major production centers in Fargo, North Dakota; Leon, Mexico; Veldhoven, Netherlands; and Mumbai, India.

=== Acquisitions ===
==== Traffic.com ====
Traffic.com (also known periodically as Navteq Traffic, Traffic Pulse, and Mobility Technologies), was a provider in the United States of hourly traffic information via a number of media, including the Internet, cell phones, radio, satellite radio, and television, from 2000 to 2013. The company was founded in 1998 as Argus Information Systems. On November 6, 2006, Navteq announced it had agreed to purchase Traffic.com, officially closing the deal on March 7, 2007. Nokia acquired Navteq for $8.1 billion on July 10, 2008. The company was headquartered in Malvern, Pennsylvania, just outside Philadelphia, until 2010 when it was moved to Nokia's headquarters in Chicago shortly after their acquisition of Navteq. XM Satellite Radio was the main client of Traffic Pulse, and its media partners included AccuWeather and The Weather Channel. Its main competitors in the information service and broadcast industries were Westwood One and Clear Channel Communications (the latter of which was a former client of Westwood).

In early 2007, Navteq acquired The Map Network, the largest supplier of mapping to U.S. tourism and convention agencies. Later that year, Navteq moved their headquarters from Chicago's Merchandise Mart complex to the Boeing Building in Chicago. In September 2009, Navteq acquired Acuity Mobile, a mobile marketing technology company.

==== Trapster ====
In December 2010, Navteq purchased Trapster, a small company based in California that provided free information on speed traps, red-light cameras, and road hazard alerts using community-generated content. Trapster had been a finalist in Navteq's 2008 Global LBS Challenge. A Navteq spokesperson said that "Navteq believes that community-generated data has a critical part to play in location content".

=== Acquired by Nokia ===
On 1 October 2007, it was announced that Nokia would acquire Navteq in a deal valued at an estimated US$8.1 billion (€5.7 billion). Navteq shareholders approved the deal in December 2007. The European Commission in July 2008 ruled the deal did not violate antitrust rules, clearing the way for closing the deal.

Navteq's principal rival Tele Atlas was acquired by TomTom in 2008.

==== Merged ====
In 2011, Nokia announced Navteq would be fully merged into Nokia, its CEO Larry Kaplan assisting through year end and leaving the company. The newly formed entity, branded Nokia Location & Commerce, would be headed by Michael Halbherr, and be formed of Nokia and former Navteq employees. Nokia also announced the closing of two Navteq offices in Malvern, PA (former Traffic.com) and Bonn, Germany, affecting more than 300 employees.

=== Rebrand to Here ===
In 2012, Nokia, announced that it would cut 10,000 jobs, which included the closing of their traffic gathering offices in many major cities across the United States. From 2012 to 2013 Traffic.com disseminated traffic information to end-users around the United States solely from their operations headquarters in Chicago. In 2013, Nokia sold the Traffic.com URL address and adopted "Here.com" to pair with their new mapping division's identity, Here. The new brand name, HERE, was introduced for Nokia Location & Commerce. The website functions in the same fashion as Traffic.com did, providing traffic information over maps of major cities.

On 3 August 2015 Nokia announced an agreement to sell Here to a consortium of three German automotive companies, Audi AG, BMW Group and Daimler AG, at an enterprise value of 2.8 billion euros. The consortium will jointly own Here, which will continue to operate as a separate business and serve other customers besides its owners.

== See also ==
- Comparison of web map services
- Tele Atlas
