= NNG (company) =

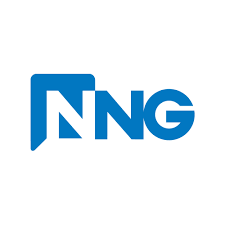
- Type: Public/Private
- Industry: Technology
- Founded: 2004
- Headquarters: Budapest, Hungary
- Area served: Global
- Products: Navigation and infotainment systems
- Number of employees: 250
- Website: www.nng.com

NNG, formerly known as Nav N Go (/ˈnævəŋɡoʊ/) is a company which provides navigation software for the automotive, enterprise, wireless and personal navigation industries. In 2016, NNG had nearly 1000 employees, 12 offices and 4 auxiliary offices on 6 continents. NNG's products are based on the iGO Navigation Engine, which consists of the navigation software, user interfaces, and related content and services, which it sells to device manufacturers, auto makers, network operators, and transport specialist companies.

== History ==
NNG was established in Budapest, Hungary in 2004. It was founded by GPS&More Ltd., Navi-Gate Kft, Pdamill Kft. and Attila Kátai. Its first product, "iGO My way" was introduced at the CeBIT trade fair in Hanover, Germany in 2006. It fit on a 1GB SD-card. At CeBIT 2008, "iGO 8", with 3D visualization software (iGO 8), was introduced. Also in 2008, Naviextras.com, NNG’s map and content update portal was launched.

"iGO amigo" was introduced at CeBIT 2009 for first-time navigation users. Later in 2009 "iGO My way for Mobile" was launched, running on various mobile platforms including iPhone. At CeBIT 2010 the company's new navigation product "iGO primo" was introduced.

In December 2010, the company was renamed from Nav N Go to NNG. At CeBIT Hannover, in 2011, NNG introduced its upgraded software for iPhone, the iGO primo app, which has continued to be the company's main iGO Navigation product.

At about that time, the 2012 version of Ford’s Territory automobile went into production with NNG’s navigation on board.

In December 2011, NNG opened its new office in China. In July, 2012 NNG and Vodafone signed a global agreement allowing NNG to deliver connectivity products to its OEM partners with Vodafone’s machine to machine (M2M) SIM card along with its software licenses. Also NNG introduced version 2.0 of iGO primo.

IN 2012, NNG released version six of its iGO software. By 2012 NNG had sold about 20 million licenses to line-fit OEM partners, and in NNG reached employed about 400 people.

At Telematics Detroit 2013 NNG introduced NavFusion, a product which integrated smartphone technology to cars. The company provided navigation equipment for automobile manufacturers, dealers and aftermarket retailers, for traditional, hybrid and electric vehicles.

In 2014, the majority of NNG’s business came from the automotive industry, mainly for infotainment systems and navigation components as Software Development Kits (SDK) to its customers.

Currently NNG works together with numerous hardware Tier1s and automotive OEMs to improve the core driving experience and in-car connectivity. Their focus is to maximizing the potential of the car-phone-human ecosystem. According to their website, their solutions are currently used in more than 30 car brands, and have partnerships with 7 out of the top 10 car manufacturers around the world.

NNG has co-operations with 26 automotive brands. in 46 languages and for over 130 countries. The company provides navigation solutions for PNDs and for mobile handsets, and also develops and sells location-aware services for developers of Fleet Management and Mobile Resource Management Systems – integrating applications with iGO Navigation and communication features. Another product, Naviextras.com, provides map updates and extra features for devices running on iGO 8, iGO amigo and iGO primo.

== See also ==
- Global Positioning System
- Speech synthesis
- List of companies of Hungary
