= NNG =

NNG may refer to:

- Nar Nar Goon railway station, Australia
- National Number Group, U.K. telephone numbering scheme
- Nielsen Norman Group, usability consultancy firm based in Fremont, California, U.S.
- NNG (company), Hungary-based company, developer of the iGO navigation software
- Neart Na Gaoithe, Offshore wind farm in Scotland
- Newark North Gate railway station, in England
- Nanning Wuxu International Airport, IATA code
- N'n'G, a pseudonym of English house/garage duo Grant Nelson and Norris 'Da Boss' Windross
- Netherlands New Guinea, now known as Papua and West Papua provinces of Indonesia
- NNG (software), "Nanomsg Next Generation", a Nanomsg message-passing project
