= Mio Technology =

Taiwanese company

Mio Technology Corporation
- Type: Public
- Founded: 2002
- Headquarters: Taipei, Taiwan
- Number of employees: 900
- Website: www.mio.com

Mio Technology Corporation (Chinese: 宇達電通股份有限公司), a subsidiary of MiTAC International Corporation, is a Taiwanese electronics maker that manufactures and markets pocket PCs, personal digital assistants (PDAs), smartphones and personal navigation devices (PNDs). It sells products under the "Navman" and "Mio" brands.

Mio Technology currently has operations in Taiwan, China, Japan, South Korea, Australia, New Zealand, and Europe. Mio Technology is among the world's top three personal navigation device vendors, which also includes TomTom International BV and Garmin Ltd. Currently they make car and bicycle navigation units and dashboard cameras.

== Products ==
Several Mio DigiWalker (C720t, C520 and C320) and Mio Moov (A470, A430, 370, 360 and 300) devices include traffic message channel (TMC).

=== Portable car navigation ===
- C7xx Series: C710, C720, C720t, C728
- C5xx Series: C510, C510E, C520, C520t
- C3xx Series: C310, C310s, C310x, C310sx, C320
- C2xx Series: C210, C210s, C220, C230, C250

The new range is the Mio Moov and the Mio Moov Spirit.

- Mio Moov range: Moov 150, Moov 200, Moov 210, Moov 300, Moov 310, Moov 330, Moov 360 (EEU only), Moov 370, Moov 500, Moov 510, Moov 550, Moov 580
- Moov Spirit range: Mio Moov Spirit S300 (S305), Mio Moov Spirit S500 (S505) and (S555), Mio Moov Spirit TV (V505) and (V735)
- Spirit 2010 Range: Mio Spirit 470, Mio Spirit 475, Mio Spirit 575.

There were variants produced for spot deals and limited runs.

- Spirit Range 2011: Mio Spirit 380, Mio Spirit 480, 485, 486, Mio Spirit 680, 685, 686, 687, 688
- Spirit Range 2013: Mio Spirit 490LM, 495LM, 497LM, Mio Spirit 695lm, 697lm, 697LM with truck routing features

=== PDA navigation ===
- DigiWalker series (especially 168 and 180)
- Axx Series: A201
- Pxx Series: P350, P550, P360, P560

=== GPS PDA Phone ===
- Axx Series: A501, A502, A700, A701, A702

=== Handheld navigation ===
- Hxx Series: H610

=== Smartphones ===
- 8xxx Series: 8380, 8390

=== Mio A700/A701 ===
This model was one of the most popular Mio-branded products, since at its launch in 2006 it was one of the few on the market that combined GPS functions with a GSM phone.

- CPU: Intel PXA 270, 520 MHz
- Display: 16 bit TFT, 320x240 pixels
- GPS receiver: SiRFstarIII
- Expansion slots: SD/MMC (SDIO compatible)

=== Mio C310x ===
- Accuracy (feet) < 9.8
- Voice-guided commands
- Compass
- Display: 3.5" Touch-screen
- Memory: 1GB ROM, 64MB RAM, expandable
- MP3 playback
- Battery life : Up to 5 hours
- Dimensions : 4.3 x 3.0 x 0.8 inches
- Weight: 6 oz

=== Mio C720t ===
The C720t is a cumulative development on previous models of Mio Technology. This model has a 2-mega-pixel camera allowing the user to create their own points of interest (POI). The camera takes the picture of the destination and navigates back to it when needed. This camera also has business card recognition software, which detects the card and stores its information in the contacts folder of the device.

Besides the new camera, the C720t comes complete with full media powers (pictures, video, and music), as well as Bluetooth capabilities. Mio provides for over 12 million POI's, more than any other companies at this time (October 2007). Available with this is the Traffic Messaging Channel (TMC) which detects and notifies upcoming traffic and helps the driver navigate around it.

=== Mio S495 LM ===
Mio S495 LM was launched in 2013 as the mid-top range model for the Spirit series. It comes with Spirit software and maps of all the European countries. The device has the LM extension which means that it can update maps free of charge anytime you need. The S495LM comes equipped with the same Samsung CPU of 400 MHz present in 2012 models as well, and has a working memory of 128 MHz. As for the premium functions of this device it has: TMC, parking assistance and multiple route choice. Maps from the Tele Atlas provider are used which offer great coverage of most European countries but are less detailed in Eastern Europe. For instance in countries such as Romania or Ukraine some county roads and roundabouts – that have been there for a year or two - are missing.

=== Knight Rider GPS ===
Mio created a GPS that features the voice of William Daniels, who played KITT in the hit 1980s television show Knight Rider. It has two LED lights on each side that are in sync with KITT's voice. The product was released on 24 September 2008 at RadioShack to coincide with the season premiere of the new Knight Rider series.
