= Acer DX900 =

Mobile phone model

- Manufacturer: Acer
- Availability by region: Q2 2009
- Compatible networks: HSDPA (3.5G), UMTS, Quad band GSM / GPRS / EDGE GSM 850, GSM 900, GSM 1800, GSM 1900,
- Form factor: Candybar
- Dimensions: 106 (l) x 60.5 (w) x 17 (h) mm
- Weight: 147 g (5 oz)
- Operating system: Microsoft Windows Mobile 6.1 Professional
- CPU: 533MHz Samsung S3C 6400
- Memory: 128 MB SDRAM, 256 MB flash ROM
- Removable storage: MicroSD
- Battery: Li-Ion (1530 mAh)
- Rear camera: 3 Megapixels with autofocus (back)
- Front camera: VGA (front)
- Display: 640 x 480 px, 2.8 in, TFT LCD, Touch Screen
- Connectivity: USB 2.0, Bluetooth 2.0 +EDR, Wi-Fi b/g, GPS
- Data inputs: Touch Screen

The Acer DX900 is the lead device in the company’s range of five mobile phones, labeled the Acer Tempo Smartphone Series. It was announced at the Mobile World Congress during February 2009.

The DX900 is a 2G/3G quad-band Windows Mobile device for professional users. It features dual SIM capabilities for users who want to split business and personal phone usage, or use one SIM in their home country and one when travelling. Significantly one of the SIMs is rated for 3G/data with tri-band UMTS / HSDPA and quad-band GSM support, while the other is 2G tri-band GSM.

The device features a 2.8-inch, 640 x 480 touch screen, which is operated via a stylus. There is a front-mounted VGA camera for video calling and a 3MP autofocus rear-mounted camera. Internal sensors include an accelerometer and a light sensor. Location-based services are provided by SiRFstarIII GPS. Talk time is up to five hours, while standby is up to 150 hours.

The Windows Mobile 6.1 Professional software suite includes access to the Outlook Mobile email client, as well as mobile versions of Internet Explorer, MSN Messenger, Windows Live and Windows Media Player 10.

At launch, the cost of the DX900 was around the £400/€500 mark (excluding tax). It is available in Asia and the European and Middle East markets.
