= Sony Pyxis =

Pyxis
- Manufacturer: Sony
- Introduced: July 1991; 35 years ago
- Discontinued: 1995; 31 years ago
- Type: GPS navigation device
- Slots: 2× swappable database card slots (IPS-760)
- Dimensions: IPS-360: 3.875 by 2.25 by 1.5 inches (9.84 by 5.72 by 3.81 cm); IPS-760: 4.5 by 8.9 by 1.3 inches (11.4 by 22.6 by 3.3 cm)

The Pyxis is a discontinued line of GPS navigation devices manufactured by Sony from 1991 to 1995. It comprised two models: the Pyxis IPS-360 and the Pyxis IPS-760. The Pyxis was one of the first consumer GPS navigation devices on the market. As well, it was the first portable GPS to feature swappable map databases.

== Development ==
The Pyxis was developed by Sony's Personal Information Products division in the early 1990s, led by Ken Turner. It was one of the first consumer-oriented GPS navigation devices available on the market, appearing two years after the introduction of the first mass-market GPS navigation device, Magellan's NAV 1000. The development of the Pyxis coincided with the demand for GPS navigation devices exploding in the turn of the 1990s, following their much-publicized use in the Gulf War. Sony sought to compete with the two largest companies in the GPS industry at the time, Magellan and Trimble. Whereas those two companies geared their products primarily toward professional and military use, Sony aimed the Pyxis at recreational and leisurely use, such as boating, backpacking, and general aviation. Sony announced the first model in the Pyxis line, the IPS-360, in July 1991 and released it the following month. It retailed for less than half the price of the equivalent Magellan system, at US$1,150 (equivalent to $2,718 in 2025). Sony named the device after the Pyxis constellation, which itself gets its name from the Latin noun pyxis nautica, meaning a mariner's compass.

In the summer of 1993, Sony introduced the successor and final entry in the Pyxis line, the IPS-760. It featured a significantly larger screen than its predecessor and, crucially, added the ability to display a moving map. It was the first portable GPS to contain swappable database cards. These cards allowed users to replace the general map with ones aimed at aviators and boaters. These cards were manufactured by Sony and were specific to the IPS-760. Sony partnered with Arnav Systems and Jeppesen to provide the aviation map databases and with C-MAP to provide the boating map databases.

The Pyxis line was ultimately discontinued in late 1995, with Sony selling off the remaining inventory to closeout catalog resellers. According to Aviation Consumer, Sony struggled to compete with the established Trimble as well as newcomers like Garmin and II Morrow, all of which had graphical GPS navigation devices around the time of the IPS-760's release.

== Specifications ==
=== IPS-360 ===
The Pyxis IPS-360 is a four-channel portable GPS navigation device consisting of two primary components: a swivel-mounted antenna and a control and display unit (CDU). The CDU, which measures 3.875 by 2.25 by 1.5 inches (9.84 by 5.72 by 3.81 cm), is connected to the antenna via a 23-foot-long extension cable. This long cable allows the antenna to be externally mounted on a vehicle or vessel while the CDU is operated from a separate interior location. The antenna can also be directly attached to the CDU, expanding its length to 6.875 inches (17.46 cm). The CDU is a two-line dot-matrix LCD, which normally shows the current position in latitude and longitude.

The IPS-360 accepts four internal AA batteries, providing approximately two hours of operation. An optional plug-in Ni–Cd battery pack extended the run time to 20 hours. Alternatively, the IPS-360 can be powered directly via a 12-volt automobile auxiliary power outlet, with a rated current draw of 175 mA. Sony also included a mounting plate for attaching the IPS-360 to a fixed surface.

Initial operation requires a 30-minute initialization procedure, during which the system acquires satellites and establishes a local geodetic system. This geodetic system is stored in non-volatile memory, enabling rapid satellite acquisition upon wake-up. Besides displaying the current location, the IPS-360 can also display the coordinates of selected waypoints. It can also output real-time telemetry, including the present velocity, the heading and distance to a selected waypoint, and an indicator that contrasts the current trajectory against a desired waypoint. The hardware lacks offline route planning functionality; the antenna requires an unobstructed line of sight to the sky to achieve a position fix before bearing and distance calculations to designated waypoints can be computed. Consequently, route planning must be performed manually using paper maps.

=== IPS-760 ===
The Pyxis IPS-760 is an eight-channel portable GPS navigation device. It replaces the two-line LCD of its predecessor with a backlit, 4.5-inch graphical LCD, capable of displaying a moving map detailing terrain and other topographical features as well as coordinates. The CDU is substantially larger to accommodate the enhanced LCD, measuring 4.5 by 8.9 by 1.3 inches (11.4 by 22.6 by 3.3 cm). On the side of the CDU are slots for two database cards. These cards allowed users to replace the general map with activity-specific maps geared toward flying (displaying the locations of national airports, VORs, and NDBs) and boating (showing nautical charts). The IPS-760 is capable of storing up to 1,000 waypoints, all of which can be overlaid on the moving map. This also makes route planning finally possible on the Pyxis. With the use of AA batteries, the IPS-760 lasts roughly 4.5 hours; like the IPS-360, a rechargeable Ni–Cd battery pack was optional.
