= LRK (disambiguation) =

LRK could refer to:

- Little Rock (Amtrak station), Arkansas, US, Amtrak station code
- Liechtenstein Red Cross (LRK)
- Long Range Kinematic
- LR(k), a type of LR parser in computing
