= Satellite navigation software =

Software used for GPS navigation

Satellite navigation software or GNSS navigation software a category of software that provide positioning services by utilizing data from satellite navigation systems.

Key functions of satellite navigation software usually includes:

1. Positioning: determines the device's precise location using signals from multiple satellites
2. Route planning: calculates optimized route based on user needs, such as starting point, destination, and travelling mean, et cetera. This functionality could be extended to driving assistant.
3. Tracking: shows where the tracked object have been. (This functionality relies past positioning data to be stored, so not just the "software" technically).

Additional functions that extends the capabilities of satellite navigation software includes:

1. Searching: finds locations with addresses or GNSS coordinates (latitude and longitude).
2. Traffic updates: shows real-time traffic information, enabling the software to suggest a better route during driving.
3. Offline map: allows regions of map to be pre-downloaded, enabling usage with minimal connectivity.
4. Bookmarking: saves locations for later use.

== Requirement ==
Hardware-wise, a GNSS receiver is needed to interpret satellite signals and compute the user’s location. Nowadays, it is usually a single integrated circuit (IC).

Satellite navigation software is most commonly used on mobile devices, particularly mobile phones, to provide the positioning functionality. However, relying exclusively on GNSS data is not accurate enough due to the limitations of GNSS services, To address this, Assisted GNSS (A-GNSS) is used instead. By leveraging data from nearby cellular towers, Wi-Fi, and Bluetooth connections, A-GNSS enhances accuracy, reduces power consumption, lowers the risk of signal blockage, and effectively mitigates the limitations of GNSS.

== Software products ==
There are many navigation software products available. The primary distinction is whether it is designed for use on land, water or air. Below is a short-listed software products:

=== Land-based ===
Free and open source

- OpenStreetMap (Cross-platform) open source and free
- OsmAnd (Android) open source, and free
- MoNav (Cross-platform) open source and free
- Navit (Cross-platform) open source and free

Proprietary (available for free)

- Apple Maps (iOS, macOS, watchOS)
- Google Earth (Windows, Mac, Linux, with website)
- Google Maps (platform independent, with website)
- Magic Earth (Android, iOS, with website)
- Mapy.cz (Android, iOS, with website) - freemium
- Waze (Android, iOS)
- Windows Maps (Windows)

Commercial

- DeLorme Street Atlas USA and Topo USA
- HERE
- Rand McNally
- Navigon
- Navman
- Magellan
- Mireo
- iGO
- ROUTE 66
- TomTom Navigator
- TomTom Mobile
- TeleType WorldNavigator
- TPL Maps
- OziExplorer
- GPSS

=== Marine navigation software ===
Navigation software for use on the water has many features in common with land-based GNSS navigation software. It can use electronic navigation chart or raster charts, usually provides user ability to plan routes and set waypoints, and may have live GPS tracking capabilities. In addition, marine navigation software often has option to control external autopilot for automated boat navigation. It may incorporate GRIB weather overlay on the chart, Tide predictions and other related information services of additional use to mariners.

Free and open source

- OpenCPN (Cross-platform) open source and free

=== Aeronautical navigation software ===
This kind of software usually creates a modern glass cockpit and uses more than just a single GNSS sensor to assist the navigation. Such sensors are Attitude and Heading Reference Systems (AHRS) and Inertial Measurement Unit (IMU) sensors.

== See also ==
- Comparison of free off-line GPS software
- Comparison of commercial GPS software
- Comparison of web map services
- Geopositioning
- GPS software-defined receiver
- Wayfinding software
