= Satellite navigation device =

Device to deduce location from satellite signals

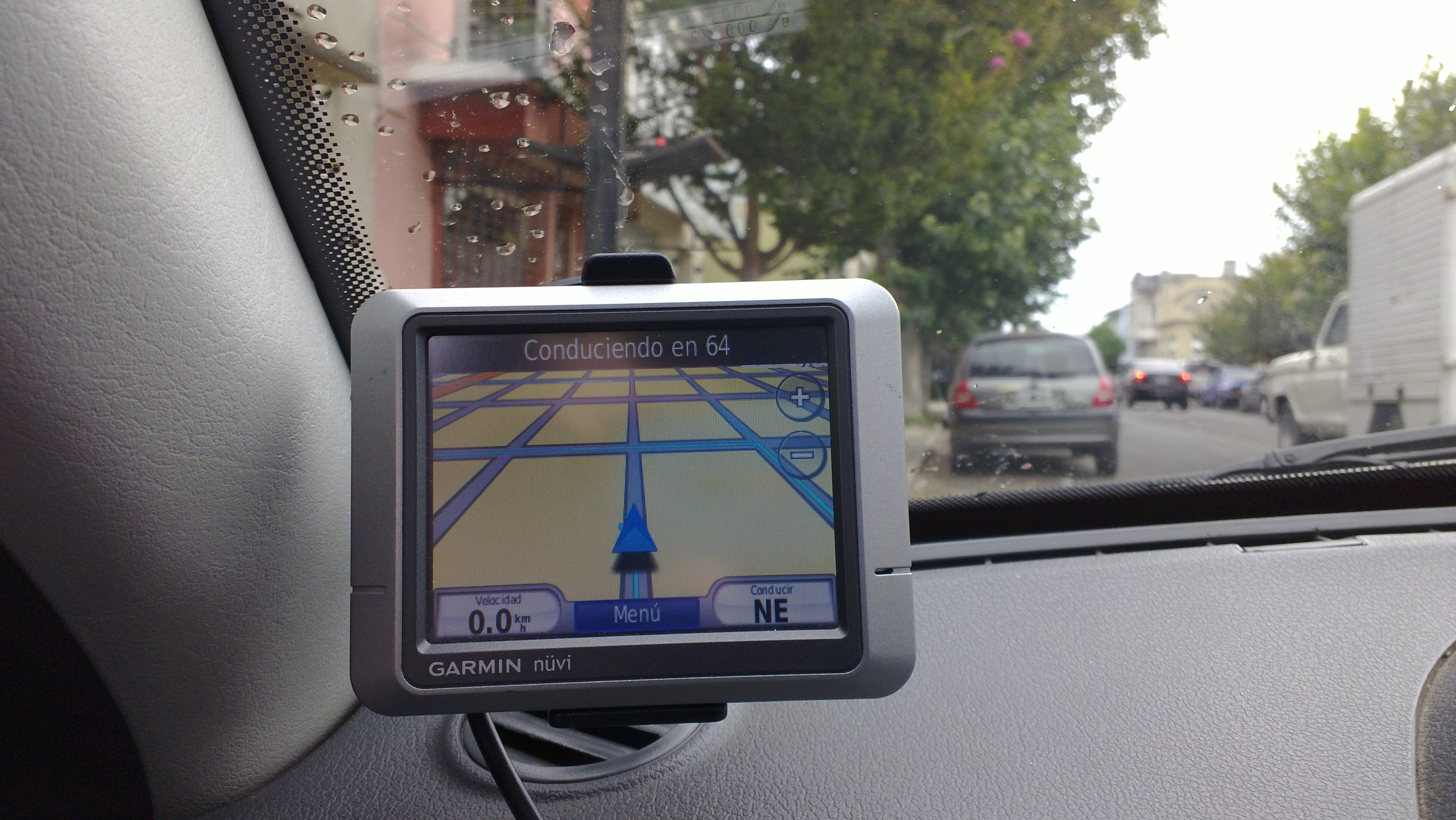
Vehicle navigation on a personal navigation assistant

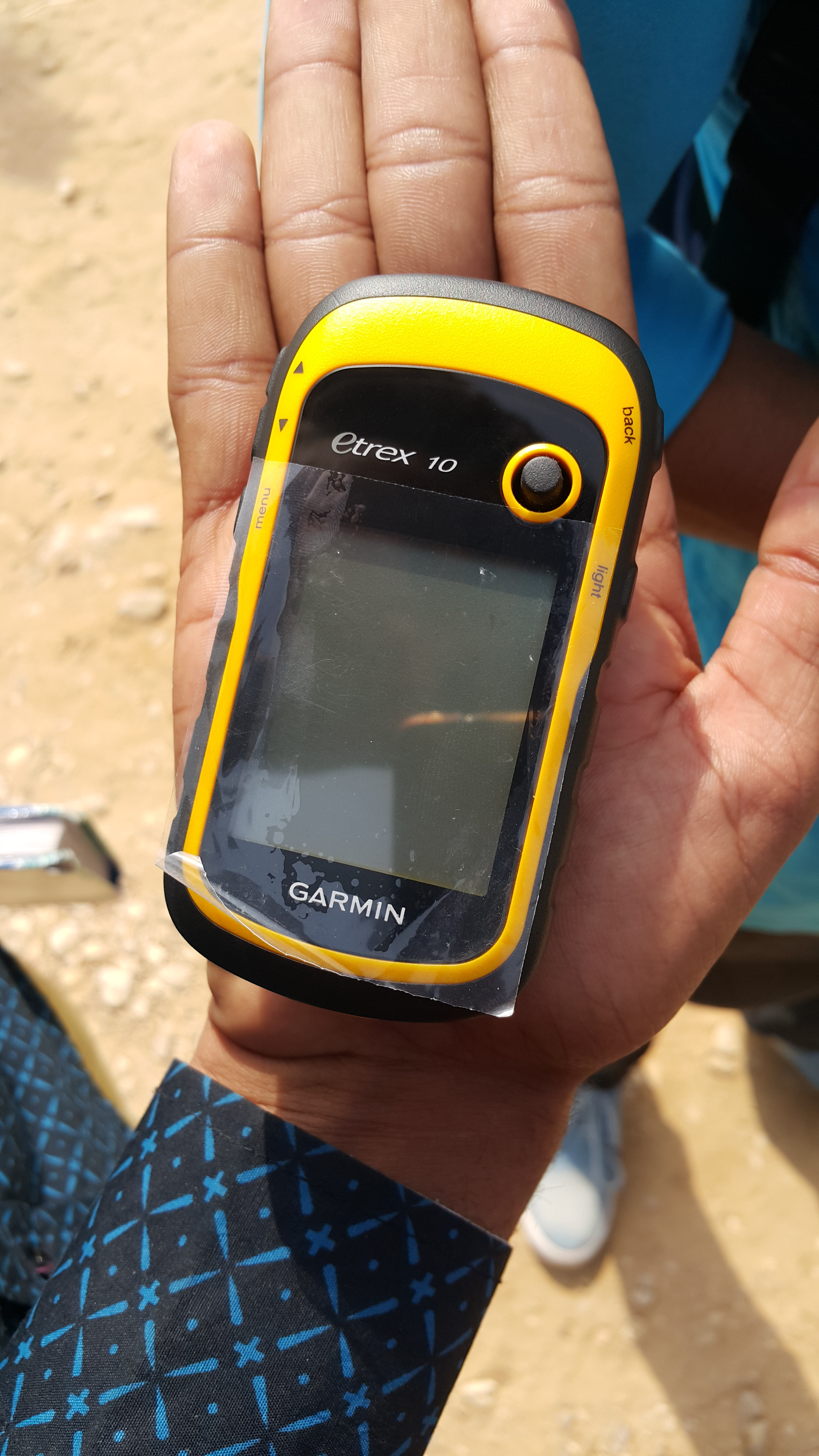
Garmin eTrex10 edition handheld

A satellite navigation device, also called a satnav device or GPS/GNSS device, uses satellites of the Global Positioning System (GPS) or other global navigation satellite systems (GNSS) to determine the user's geographic coordinates. It may also display the user's position on a map and offer routing directions (as in turn-by-turn navigation).

There are four global navigation satellite systems (GNSS): the United States' Global Positioning System (GPS), the European Union's Galileo, Russia's GLONASS, and China's BeiDou Navigation Satellite System. These systems are often used together to improve positioning accuracy and availability. In addition, regional systems such as India's NavIC and Japan's Quasi-Zenith Satellite System (QZSS), augment the accuracy of a number of GNSS over their respective regions.

A satellite navigation device can retrieve location and time information from one or more GNSS systems in all weather conditions, anywhere on or near the Earth's surface. Satnav reception requires an unobstructed line of sight to four or more GNSS satellites, and is subject to poor satellite signal conditions. In exceptionally poor signal conditions, for example in urban areas, satellite signals may exhibit multipath propagation where signals bounce off structures, or are weakened by meteorological conditions. Obstructed lines of sight may arise from a tree canopy or inside a structure, such as in a building, garage or tunnel. Today, most standalone satnav receivers are used in automobiles. The satnav capability of smartphones may use assisted GNSS (A-GNSS) technology, which can use the base station or cell towers to provide a faster Time to First Fix (TTFF), especially when satellite signals are poor or unavailable. However, the mobile network part of the A-GNSS technology would not be available when the smartphone is outside the range of the mobile reception network, while the satnav aspect would otherwise continue to be available.

== History ==
As with many other technological breakthroughs of the latter 20th century, the modern GNSS device can reasonably be argued to be a direct outcome of the Cold War of the latter 20th century. The multibillion-dollar expense of the US and Russian programs was initially justified by military interest. In contrast, the European Galileo was conceived as purely civilian.

In 1960, the US Navy put into service its Transit satellite-based navigation system to aid in naval navigation. The US Navy in the mid-1960s conducted an experiment to track a submarine with missiles with six satellites and orbiting poles and was able to observe satellite changes. Between 1960 and 1982, as the benefits were shown, the US military consistently improved and refined its satellite navigation technology and satellite system. In 1973, the US military began to plan for a comprehensive worldwide navigational system which eventually became known as the GPS (Global Positioning System).

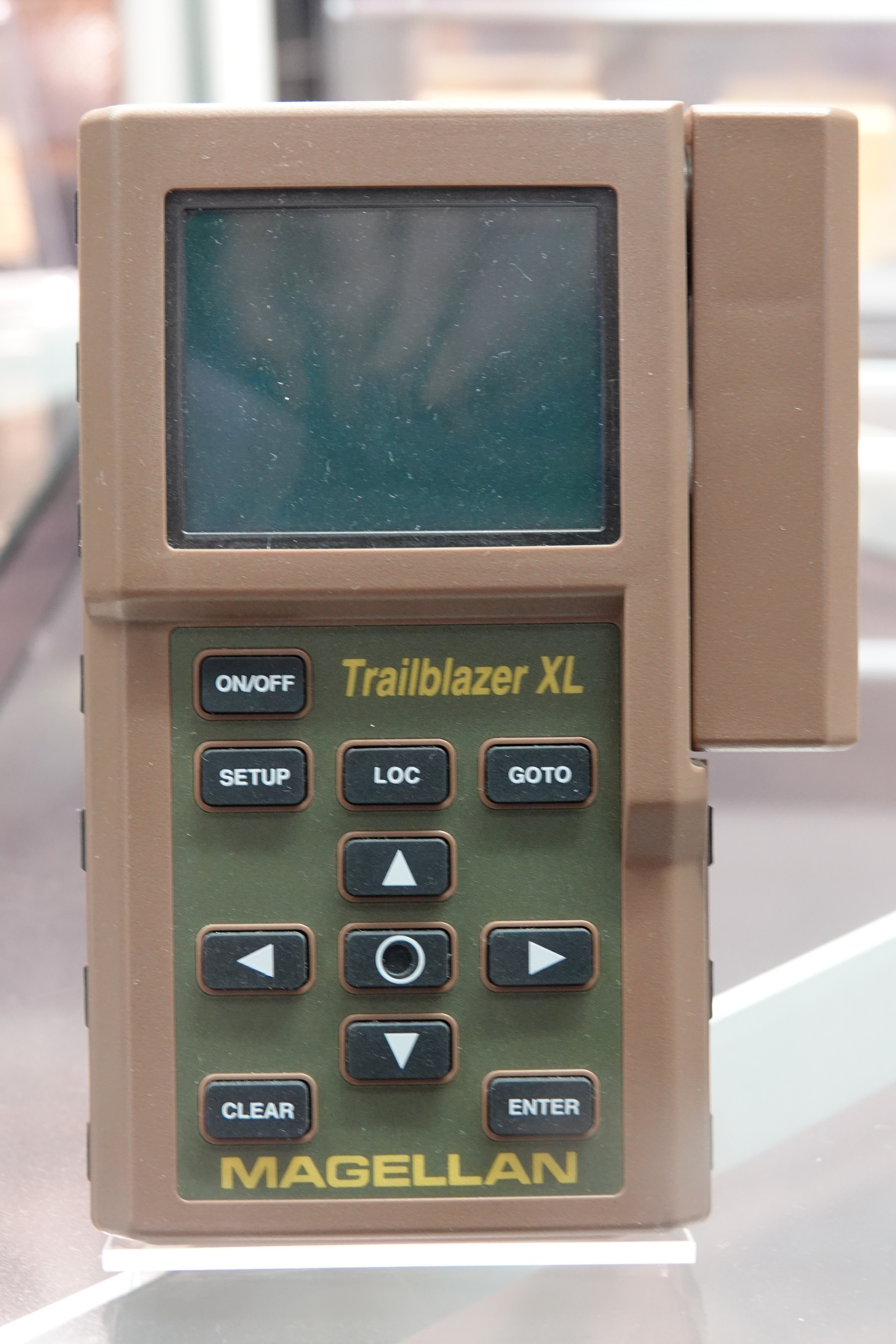
A 1993 Magellan Trailblazer XL GPS Handheld Receiver

In 1983, in the wake of the tragedy of the downing of Korean Air Lines Flight 007, an aircraft which was shot down while in Soviet airspace due to a navigational error, President Ronald Reagan made the navigation capabilities of the existing military Global Positioning System available for dual civilian use. However, civilian use was initially only a slightly degraded "Selective Availability" positioning signal. This new availability of the US military Global Positioning System for civilian use required a certain technical collaboration with the private sector for some time, before it could become a commercial reality. The Macrometer Interferometric Surveyor was the first commercial GNSS-based system for performing geodetic measurements.

In 1989, Magellan Navigation Inc. unveiled its Magellan NAV 1000, the world's first commercial handheld GPS receiver. These units initially sold for approximately US$2,900 each. In 1990, Mazda's Eunos Cosmo was the first production car in the world with a built-in satellite navigation system. In 1991, Mitsubishi introduced satnav car navigation on the Mitsubishi Debonair (MMCS: Mitsubishi Multi Communication System). In the same year, Sony introduced the Pyxis IPS-360, one of the first relatively affordable portable GPS units. The followup Pyxis IPS-760 was the first to feature swappable map database cards, aimed at aviators and boaters. In 1997, a navigation system using Differential GPS was developed as a factory-installed option on the Toyota Prius. In 2000, the Clinton administration removed the military use signal restrictions, thus providing full commercial access to the US GPS satellite system.

As GNSS navigation systems became more and more widespread and popular, the pricing of such systems began to fall, and their widespread availability steadily increased. Several additional manufacturers of these systems, such as Garmin (1991), Benefon (1999), Mio (2002) and TomTom (2002) entered the market. Mitac Mio 168 was the first PocketPC to contain a built-in GPS receiver. Benefon's 1999 entry into the market also presented users with the world's first phone based GPS navigation system. Later, as smartphone technology developed, a GPS chip eventually became standard equipment for most smartphones. To date, ever more popular satellite navigation systems and devices continue to proliferate with newly developed software and hardware applications. It has been incorporated, for example, into cameras.

While the American GPS was the first satellite navigation system to be deployed on a fully global scale, and to be made available for commercial use, this is not the only system of its type. By 2020, due to military and other concerns, there are three other global navigation satellite systems (GNSS) that has become operational; Russia's GLONASS, the European Union's Galileo, and China's BeiDou Navigation Satellite System. In addition, regional systems such as India's NavIC and Japan's Quasi-Zenith Satellite System provide coverage over specific areas.

== Technical design ==
GNSS devices vary in sensitivity, speed, vulnerability to multipath propagation, and other performance parameters. High-sensitivity receivers use large banks of correlators and digital signal processing to search for signals very quickly. This results in very fast times to first fix when the signals are at their normal levels, for example, outdoors. When signals are weak, for example, indoors, the extra processing power can be used to integrate weak signals to the point where they can be used to provide a position or timing solution.

GNSS signals are already very weak when they arrive at the Earth's surface. The GPS satellites only transmit 27 W (14.3 dBW) from a distance of 20,200 km in orbit above the Earth. By the time the signals arrive at the user's receiver, they are typically as weak as −160 dBW, equivalent to 100 attowatts (10^{−16} W). This is well below the thermal noise level in its bandwidth. Outdoors, GPS signals are typically around the −155 dBW level (−125 dBm).

=== Sensitivity ===
Conventional GPS receivers integrate the received GPS signals for the same amount of time as the duration of a complete C/A code cycle which is 1 ms. This results in the ability to acquire and track signals down to around the −160 dBW level. High-sensitivity GPS receivers are able to integrate the incoming signals for up to 1,000 times longer than this and therefore acquire signals up to 1,000 times weaker, resulting in an integration gain of 30 dB. A good high-sensitivity GPS receiver can acquire signals down to −185 dBW, and tracking can be continued down to levels approaching −190 dBW.

High-sensitivity GPS can provide positioning in many but not all indoor locations. Signals are either heavily attenuated by the building materials or reflected as in multipath. Given that high-sensitivity GPS receivers may be up to 30 dB more sensitive, this is sufficient to track through 3 layers of dry bricks, or up to 20 cm (8 inches) of steel-reinforced concrete, for example. Examples of high-sensitivity receiver chips include SiRFstarIII and MediaTekʼs MTK II.

=== Sequential receiver ===
A sequential GPS receiver tracks the necessary satellites by typically using one or two hardware channels. The set will track one satellite at a time, time tag the measurements and combine them when all four satellite pseudoranges have been measured. These receivers are among the least expensive available, but they cannot operate under high dynamics and have the slowest time-to-first-fix (TTFF) performance.

== Types ==
Consumer GNSS navigation devices include:

- Dedicated GNSS navigation devices
- modules that need to be connected to a computer to be used
- loggers that record trip information for download. Such GPS tracking is useful for trailblazing, mapping by hikers and cyclists, and the production of geocoded photographs.
- Converged devices, including satellite navigation phones and geotagging cameras, in which GNSS is a feature rather than the main purpose of the device. The majority of GNSS devices are now converged devices, and may use assisted GPS or standalone (not network dependent) or both. The vulnerability of consumer GNSS to radio frequency interference from planned wireless data services is controversial. For mobile networks, this has been solved by S-GPS.

=== Dedicated GNSS navigation devices ===
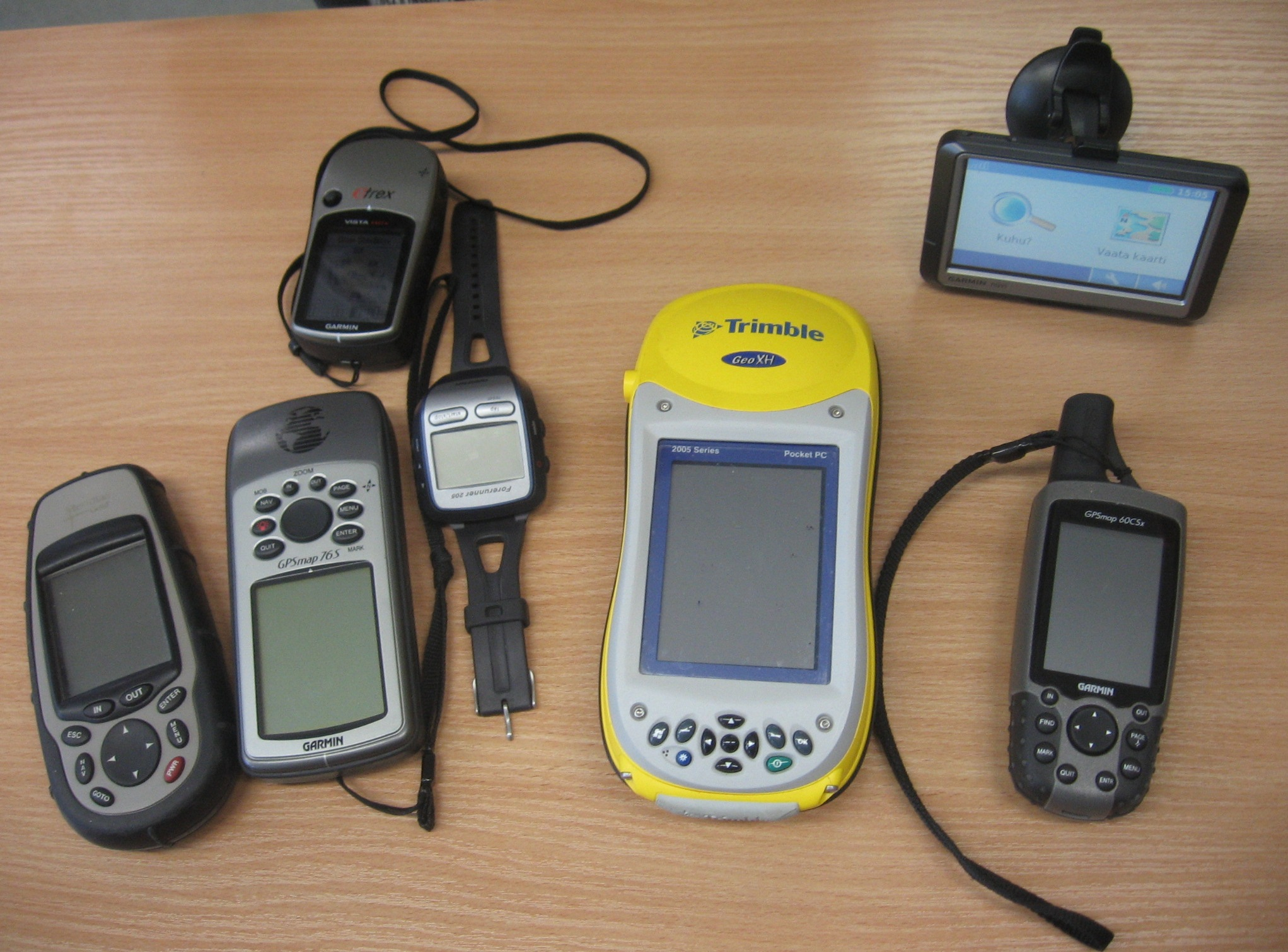
Hand-held receivers

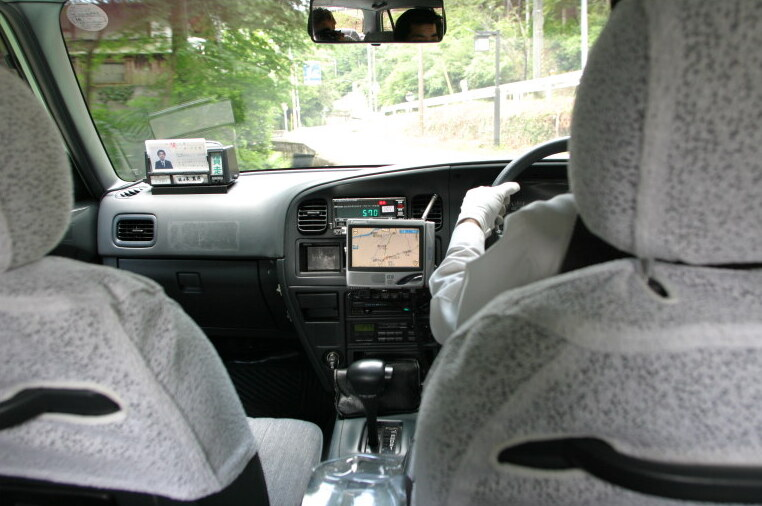
A Japanese taxi equipped with GPS

Dedicated devices have various degrees of mobility. Hand-held, outdoor, or sport receivers have replaceable batteries that can run them for several hours, making them suitable for hiking, bicycle touring and other activities far from an electric power source. Their design is ergonomical, their screens are small, and some do not show color, in part to save power. Some use transflective liquid-crystal displays, allowing use in bright sunlight. Cases are rugged and some are water-resistant.

Other receivers, often called mobile are intended primarily for use in a car, but have a small rechargeable internal battery that can power them for an hour or two away from the car. Special purpose devices for use in a car may be permanently installed and depend entirely on the automotive electrical system. Many of them have touch-sensitive screens as input method. Maps may be stored on a memory card. Some offer additional functionality such as a rudimentary music player, image viewer, and video player.

The pre-installed embedded software of early receivers did not display maps; 21st-century ones commonly show interactive street maps (of certain regions) that may also show points of interest, route information and step-by-step routing directions, often in spoken form with a feature called "text to speech".

Manufacturers include:

- Navman
- TomTom
- Garmin
- Mio Technology
- Navigon
- Magellan Navigation
- Satmap
- TeleType Co.

=== Integration into smartphones ===
Almost all smartphones now incorporate GNSS receivers. This has been driven both by consumer demand and by service suppliers. There are now many phone apps that depend on location services, such as navigational aids, and multiple commercial opportunities, such as localised advertising. In its early development, access to user location services was driven by European and American emergency services to help locate callers.

All smartphone operating systems offer free mapping and navigational services that require a data connection; some allow the pre-purchase and downloading of maps but the demand for this is diminishing as data connection reliant maps can generally be cached anyway. There are many navigation applications and new versions are constantly being introduced. Major apps include Google Maps Navigation, Apple Maps and Waze, which require data connections, iGo for Android, Maverick and HERE for Windows Phone, which use cached maps and can operate without a data connection. Consequently, almost any smartphone now qualifies as a personal navigation assistant.

The use of mobile phones as navigational devices has outstripped the use of standalone GNSS devices. In 2009, independent analyst firm Berg Insight found that GNSS-enabled GSM/WCDMA handsets in the USA alone numbered 150 million units, against the sale of only 40 million standalone GNSS receivers.

Assisted GPS (A-GPS) uses a combination of satellite data and cell tower data to shorten the time to first fix, reduce the need to download a satellite almanac periodically and to help resolve a location when satellite signals are disturbed by the proximity of large buildings. When out of range of a cell tower the location performance of a phone using A-GPS may be reduced. Phones with an A-GPS based hybrid positioning system can maintain a location fix when GPS signals are inadequate by cell tower triangulation and WiFi hotspot locations. Most smartphones download a satellite almanac when online to accelerate a GPS fix when out of cell tower range.

Some, older, Java-enabled phones lacking integrated GPS may still use external GPS receivers via serial or Bluetooth) connections, but the need for this is now rare.

By tethering to a laptop, some phones can provide localisation services to a laptop as well.

=== Palm, pocket and laptop PC ===
Software companies have made available GPS navigation software programs for in-vehicle use on laptop computers. Benefits of GPS on a laptop include larger map overview, ability to use the keyboard to control GPS functions, and some GPS software for laptops offers advanced trip-planning features not available on other platforms, such as midway stops, capability of finding alternative scenic routes as well as only highway option.

Palms and Pocket PC's can also be equipped with GPS navigation. A pocket PC differs from a dedicated navigation device as it has an own operating system and can also run other applications.

=== GPS modules ===
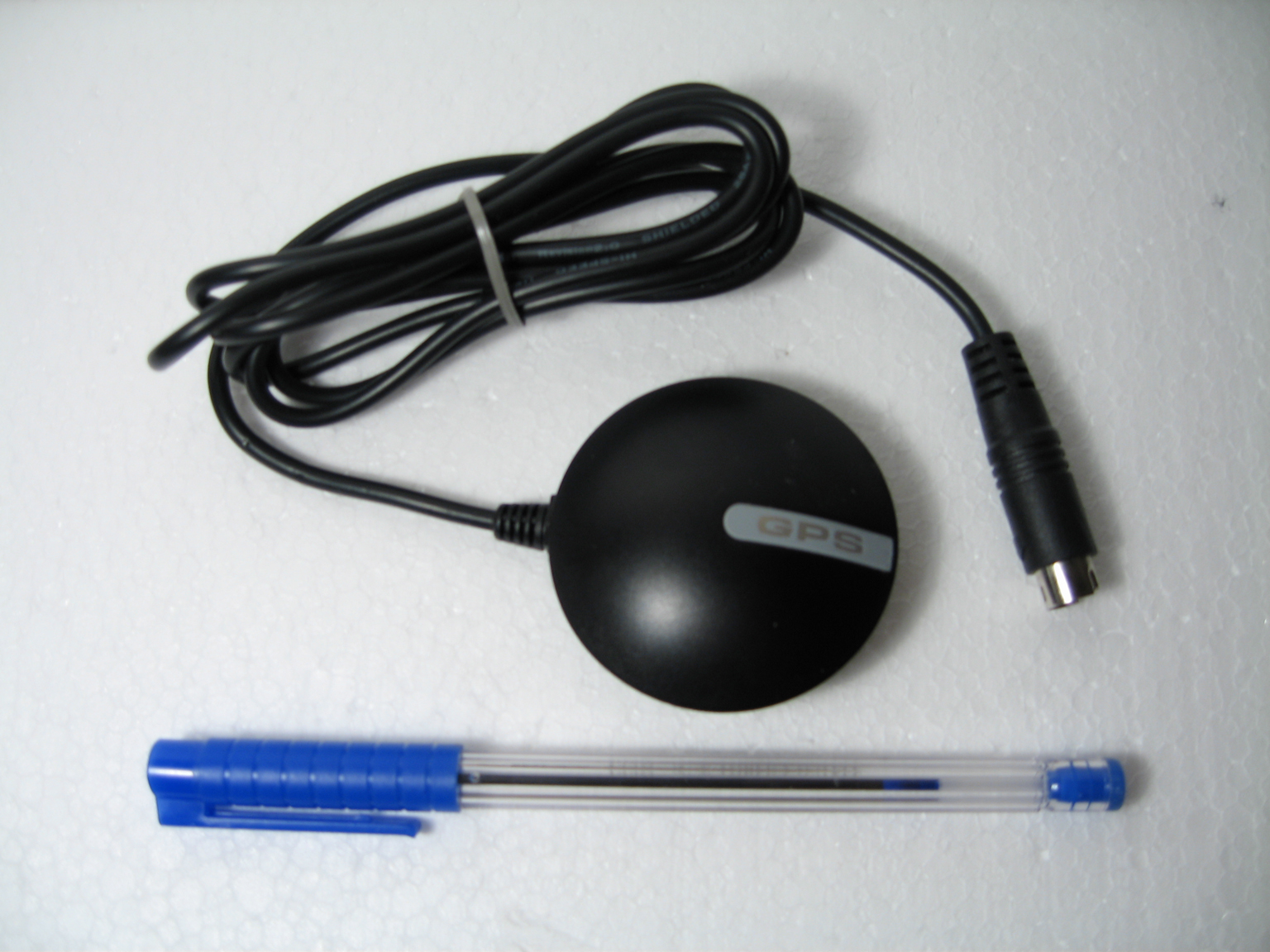
A modern SiRFstarIII chip based 20-channel GPS receiver with WAAS/EGNOS support

Other GPS devices need to be connected to a computer in order to work. This computer can be a home computer, laptop, PDA, digital camera, or smartphones. Depending on the type of computer and available connectors, connections can be made through a serial or USB cable, as well as Bluetooth, CompactFlash, SD, PCMCIA and the newer ExpressCard. Some PCMCIA/ExpressCard GPS units also include a wireless modem.

Devices usually do not come with pre-installed GPS navigation software, thus, once purchased, the user must install or write their own software. As the user can choose which software to use, it can be better matched to their personal taste. It is very common for a PC-based GPS receiver to come bundled with a navigation software suite. Also, software modules are significantly cheaper than complete stand-alone systems (around €50 to €100). The software may include maps only for a particular region, or the entire world, if software such as Google Maps are used.

Some hobbyists have also made some satnav devices and open-sourced the plans. Examples include the Elektor GPS units. These are based around a SiRFstarIII chip and are comparable to their commercial counterparts. Other chips and software implementations are also available.

== Applications ==
=== Vehicle navigation ===
An automotive navigation system takes its location from a GNSS system and, depending on the installed software, may offer the following services:

- Mapping, including street maps, text or in a graphical format,
- Turn-by-turn navigation directions via text or speech,
- Directions fed directly to a self-driving car,
- Traffic congestion maps, historical or real-time data, and suggested alternative directions,
- Information on nearby amenities such as restaurants, fueling stations, and tourist attractions,
- Alternative routes.

Modern technology allows for the integration of GPS-tracking dashcams,accurately recording the vehicle's location and speed. This information is extremely helpful for filing insurance claims and fighting unfair traffic tickets.

=== Aviation ===
Aviators use satellite navigation for navigation and to improve safety and the efficiency of the flight. This may allow pilots to be independent of ground-based navigational aids, enable more efficient routes and provide navigation into airports that lack ground-based navigation and surveillance equipment. There are now some GPS units that allow aviators to get a clearer look in areas where the satellite is augmented to be able to have safe landings in bad visibility conditions. There have now been two new signals made for GPS, the first being made to help in critical conditions in the sky and the other to make GPS more of a robust navigation service. Many aviator services have now made it a required service to use a GPS. Commercial aviation applications include GNSS devices that calculate location and feed that information to large multi-input navigational computers for autopilot, course information and correction displays to the pilots, and course tracking and recording devices.

=== Military ===
Military applications include devices similar to consumer sport products for foot soldiers (commanders and regular soldiers), small vehicles and ships, and devices similar to commercial aviation applications for aircraft and missiles. Examples are the United States military's Commander's Digital Assistant and the Soldier Digital Assistant. Prior to May 2000 only the military had access to the full accuracy of GPS. Consumer devices were restricted by selective availability (SA), which was scheduled to be phased out but was removed abruptly by President Clinton. Differential GPS is a method of cancelling out the error of SA and improving GPS accuracy, and has been routinely available in commercial applications such as for golf carts. GPS is limited to about 15 meter accuracy even without SA. DGPS can be within a few centimeters.

== Risks ==
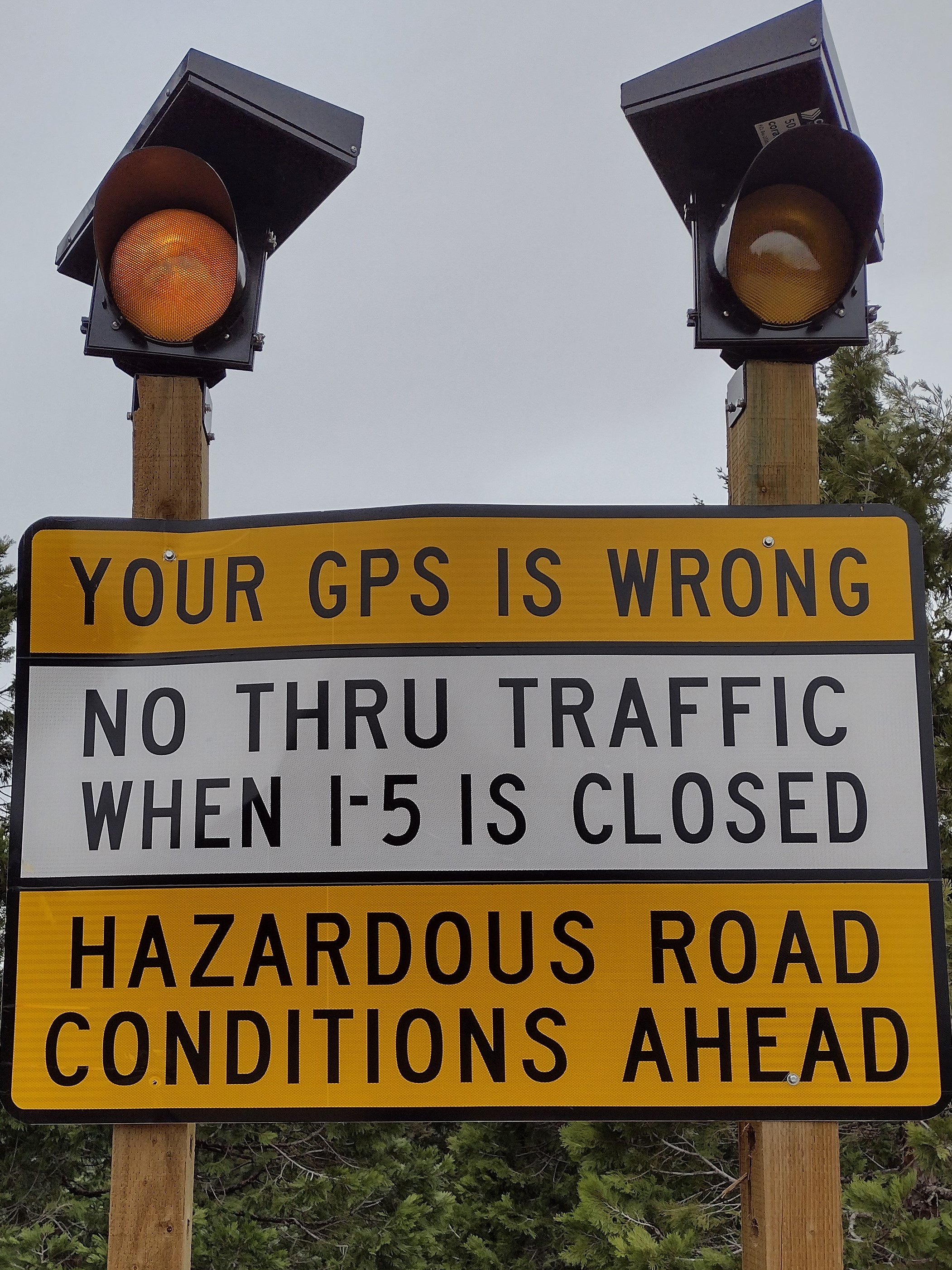
Satellite navigation devices may suggest an impossible route because it fails to take all conditions into account.

GPS maps and directions are occasionally imprecise. Some people have gotten lost by asking for the shortest route. A resident of the US state of Oregon claimed in 2010 that people were routed into his private driveway five to eight times a week because their satnavs showed a street through his property. Other hazards involve an alley being listed as a street, a lane being identified as a road, or rail tracks as a road.

=== Privacy concerns ===
User privacy may be compromised if satellite navigation equipped handheld devices such as mobile phones upload user geo-location data through associated software installed on the device. User geo-location is currently the basis for navigational apps such as Google Maps, location-based advertising, which can promote nearby shops and may allow an advertising agency to track user movements and habits for future use. Regulatory bodies differ between countries regarding the treatment of geo-location data as privileged or not. Privileged data cannot be stored, or otherwise used, without the user's consent.

Vehicle tracking systems allow employers to track their employees' location raising questions regarding violation of employee privacy. There are cases where employers continued to collect geo-location data when an employee was off duty in private time.

Rental car services may use the same technique to geo-fence their customers to the areas they have paid for, charging additional fees for violations. In 2010, New York Civil Liberties Union filed a case against the Labor Department for firing Michael Cunningham after tracking his daily activity and locations using a satnav device attached to his car. Private investigators use planted GPS devices to provide information to their clients on a target's movements.

== See also ==
- Comparison of web map services
- Dashcam
- Defense Advanced GPS Receiver
- Head unit
- Moving map display
- GPS watch
- Precision Lightweight GPS Receiver
- Radio clock
- Turn-by-turn navigation
