= Acer X960 =

Mobile phone model

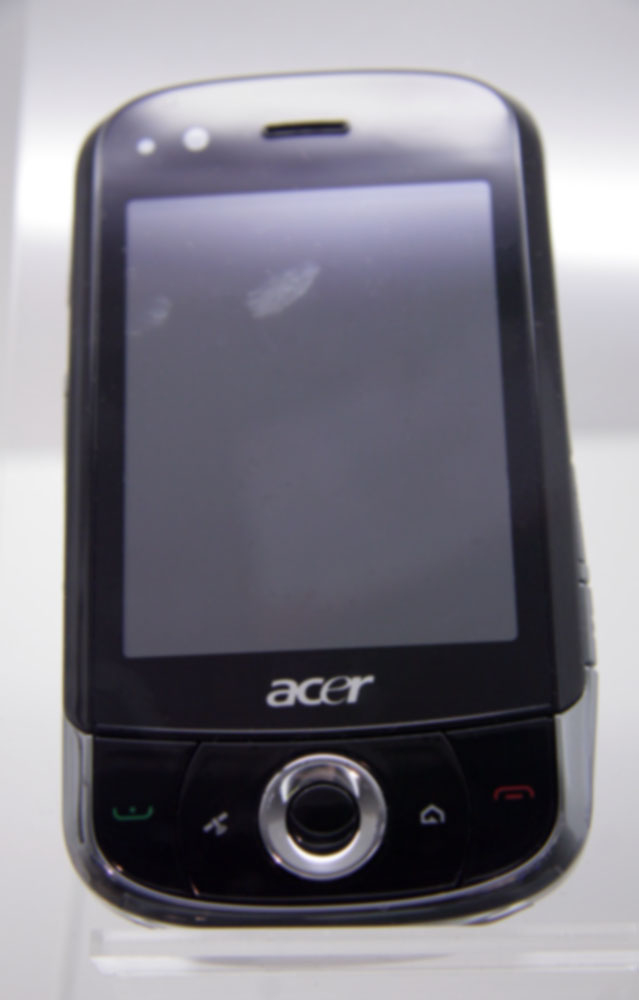
- Manufacturer: Acer
- Availability by region: Q2 2009
- Compatible networks: HSDPA (3.5G), UMTS, Quad band GSM / GPRS / EDGE GSM 850, GSM 900, GSM 1800, GSM 1900,
- Form factor: Candybar
- Dimensions: 106.4 (l) x 59 (w) x 13.7 (h) mm
- Weight: 131.5 g (5 oz)
- Operating system: Microsoft Windows Mobile 6.1 Professional
- CPU: 533MHz Samsung S3C 6400
- Memory: 128 MB SDRAM, 256 MB flash ROM
- Removable storage: MicroSD
- Battery: Li-Ion (1530 mAh)
- Rear camera: 3.2 Megapixels with autofocus and flash (back)
- Front camera: VGA (front)
- Display: 640 x 480 px, 2.8 in, TFT LCD, Touch Screen
- Connectivity: USB 2.0, Bluetooth 2.0 +EDR, Wi-Fi b/g, GPS SiRFstarIII
- Data inputs: Touch Screen

Announced at the Mobile World Congress during February 2009, the X960 is one of Acer’s first five mobile phones, labelled the Acer Tempo Smartphone Series.

The X960 is a 3.5G quad-band Windows Mobile device with a 2.8-inch, 640 x 480 touch screen, which is operated via a stylus, and a five-way navigation button. It uses Acer’s Easy Keyboard to enable messaging, while more generally the interface uses the Acer 2.0 software

The device has a 3.2MP autofocus rear mounted camera with flash, and a front-facing VGA camera for video calls. Location-based services are provided by SiRFstarIII GPS. Talk time is up to six hours, while standby is up to 275 hours. The Windows Mobile 6.1 Professional software suite includes access to the Outlook Mobile email client, as well as mobile versions of Internet Explorer, MSN Messenger, Windows Live and Windows Media Player 10.

The X960 launched at around £300/€350 (excluding tax) in Europe, the Middle East, and Asia.
