= TTFF =

TTFF may refer to:

- Time to first fix, the time required for a satellite navigation device to acquire a position
- Trinidad and Tobago Football Federation, former name of the governing body of Association football in Trinidad and Tobago

== See also ==
- "Through the Fire and Flames" ("TTFAF"), a single by DragonForce
