= Navigon =

Navigon GmbH
- The official Navigon corporate logo as of 2016.
- Company type: Subsidiary
- Industry: Information and communications technology
- Founded: 1991
- Defunct: December 1, 2020
- Fate: Discontinued
- Headquarters: Würzburg, Germany
- Products: GPS navigation software GPS navigation devices
- Number of employees: 400 (2008)
- Parent: Garmin (2011-2020)
- Website: navigon.com

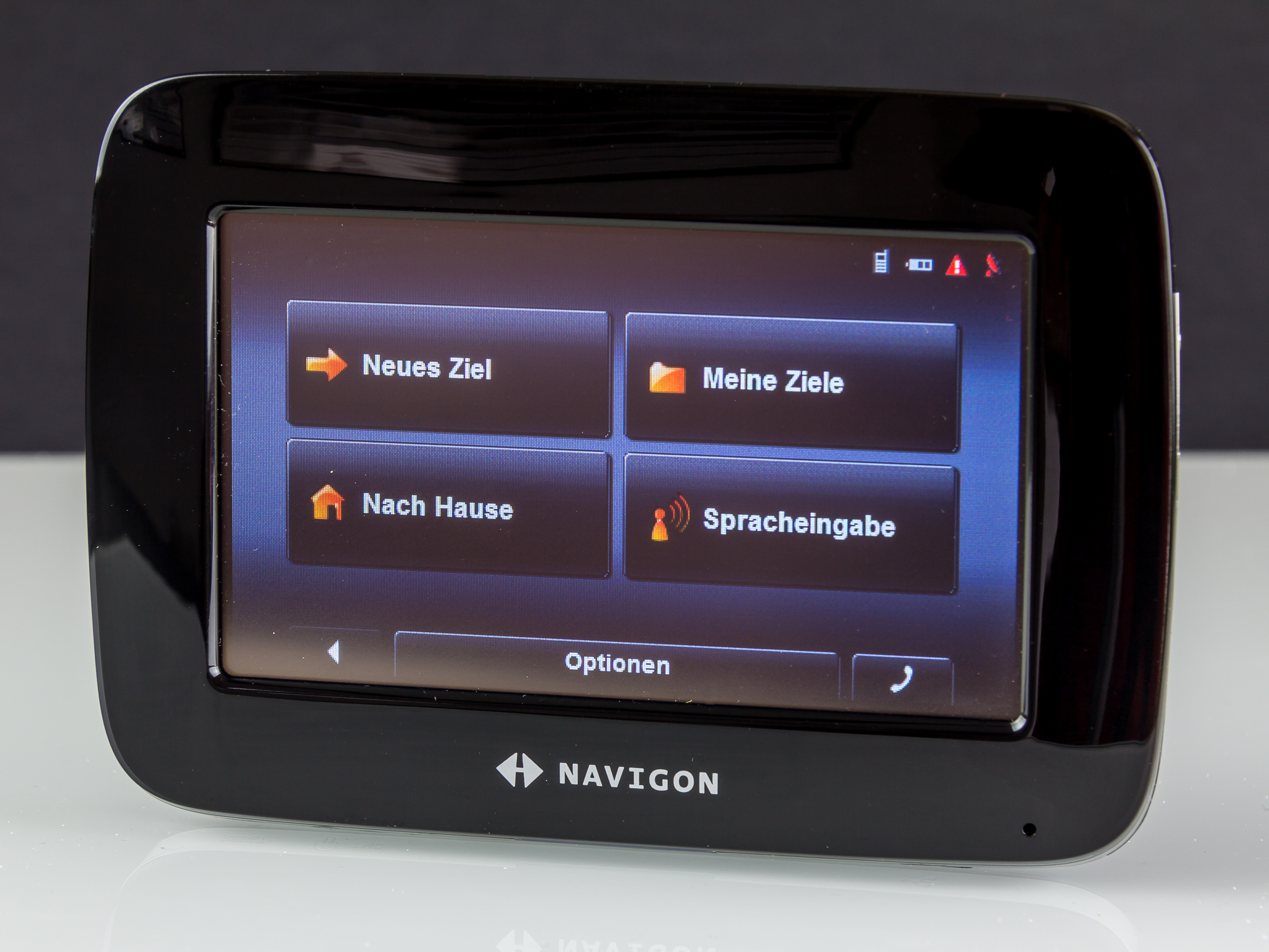
Navigon 7100

Navigon GmbH was a Würzburg, Germany-based manufacturer of GPS devices and GPS navigation software. The company was privately owned, until in June 2011, it was announced that Navigon was to be acquired by Garmin and become a subsidiary of the company. With effect from October 31, 2011, Navigon has changed its legal entity from corporation (Aktiengesellschaft) to GmbH.

Navigon's products included Navigon branded personal navigation devices as well as OEM software for the navigation, wireless, and automotive sectors. Navigon had offices in Asia, Europe, and North America, and employed more than 400 people. Navigon AG was purchased and fully acquired by Garmin Ltd. in July 2011. On December 1, 2020, Garmin has announced the discontinuation of Navigon products and customer service.

== History ==
Navigon was founded in 1991. In 2000, the firm launched the industry's first navigation software for the Pocket PC. With the introduction of Traffic Message Channel-based (TMC) traffic avoidance features in 2002, Navigon became the first company to offer such a feature on a consumer GPS product.

In 2004, after primarily catering to the European market, Navigon directly entered the North American market by forming a subsidiary, Navigon Inc. headquartered in Chicago, IL.

In 2005, the private equity firm General Atlantic bought a minority interest in the company in order to provide capital for expansion; Peter Scheufen maintains majority ownership.

In 2006, Navigon acquired Navteq's navigation software business.

=== Navigon Europe ===
Navigon GmbH was the parent company of all Navigon brands. Navigon was one of the largest GPS brands in Europe and was well established there.

Navigon GmbH sold several models that carried similar model numbers (usually differentiated with the xx10 or xx50 in their number) to those sold in North America. Most of the devices included features and functionality similar their counterparts'.

Additionally, several older Navigon GmbH models were sold under the Transonic name in Europe. These models have since been discontinued, having been replaced by Navigon's then-current offerings.

=== Navigon Inc. ===
The U.S. subsidiary, Navigon Inc., was formed in March 2004, with Edgar Christen as General Manager, to adapt and market the Navigon product line in the North American market.

Navigon Inc. announced its first OEM agreement in November 2004 with EasyPocketNAV.com, a distributor for portable GPS navigation. EasyPocketNAV.com marketed and sold the OnCourse Navigator (TM) software, based on Navigon's technology platform, which turned Microsoft-powered Pocket PCs into voice guided GPS navigation systems.

In May 2006, Navigon appointed Andreas Hecht as Senior Vice President, General Manager, of the Americas, and in May 2007 as president, General Manager. He replaced Edgar Christen as General Manager and was responsible for Navigon's operations in the U.S., Canada, Mexico, and South America. An authority in the navigation sector, Hecht was a 10-year veteran of Navteq, creators of the world's most widely used digital maps, where he served in senior executive roles in technology and business development in the U.S., Europe, and Latin America.

Navigon Inc. launched three models in the North American market in July 2007. The initial launch included the 2100 (2120 in Canada), 5100, and 7100 models. These models introduced several new features to the North American consumer GPS market including:

- Reality View - A feature which displays computer generated static images of complex Interstate Highway interchanges
- Lifetime Traffic - Traffic Message Channel (TMC) service similar to offerings from other companies, but for a one-time fee (or included with some higher end models)
- Zagat Survey Ratings & Reviews

In April 2008, Navigon Inc. expanded their line-up with the 2100 Max (2120 Max in Canada) model. This model is functionally similar to the original 2100 but includes a larger 4.3" LCD screen (rather than 3.5") and adds the company's Direct Help functionality.

On October 13, 2008, Navigon announced that Michael Roach, former director of U.S. sales for LG Electronics, would become president of Navigon's North American operations. In his role as president for the Americas, Roach lead all marketing and sales functions for the Americas. He reported directly to Egon Minar, chief sales officer at NAVIGON AG (Germany). Roach replaced Andreas Hecht.

On May 4, 2009, Navigon announced that they would cease North American sales. According to CEO Egon Minar: "Due to the difficult economic environment and the aggressive pricing we have decided to withdraw from the PND business in North America for the time being. We are however not closing down our Chicago office which will continue to serve our automotive and mobile phone businesses in North America." Since this announcement the Chicago office has, in fact, been closed.

As of August 2009, the only consumer products Navigon offered in North America were apps for Android, iOS, and Windows Phone 7. Visits from North American IP addresses to the www.navigon.com or www.navigonusa.com sites were redirected to a site devoted to the mobile apps, with no mention of former Navigon consumer products, even those that were brand new on the market less than a year before.

Despite discontinuing North American sales Navigon products were still supported, albeit only by e-mail with European support representatives, until sale of the company. Those individuals who owned Navigon's map update service prior to its discontinuation were still receiving map updates for their devices as of December 2009, but updating ended in 2011 with the sale of Navigon AG to Garmin Ltd.

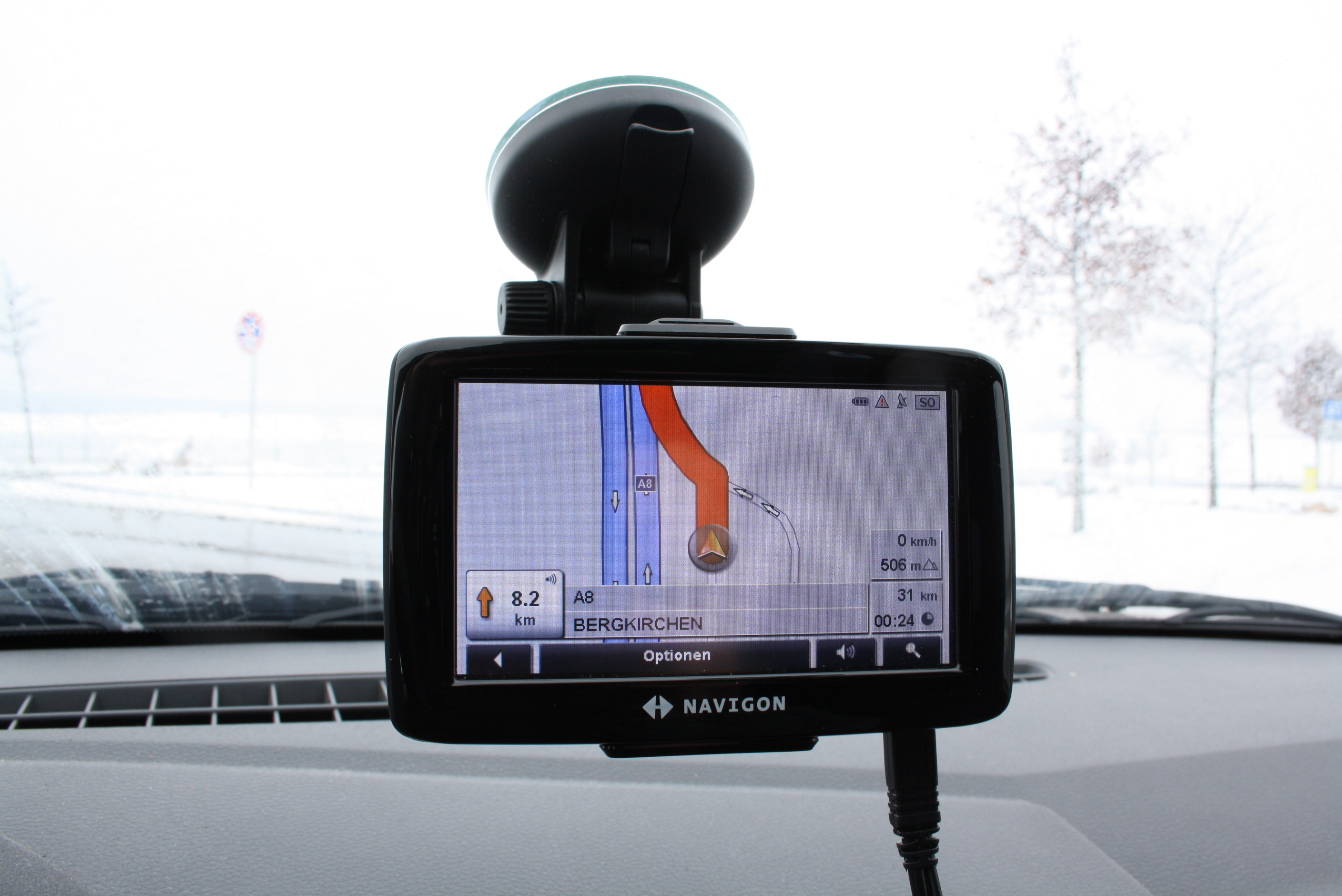
A Navigon unit in use on a windscreen

=== Acquisition by Garmin ===
On July 26, 2011, Garmin confirmed that its acquisition of Navigon was complete. The first line of its press release stated: "Garmin Ltd. (NASDAQ: GRMN), the global leader in satellite navigation, announced today that it has completed the acquisition of Navigon AG ("Navigon"), a privately held navigation provider headquartered in Würzburg, Germany." The electric car manufacturer Tesla Inc. used Navigon Garmin systems in their cars before developing their own system.

==== Discontinued North American Products ====
- Navigon 2000S
- Navigon 2090S (RadioShack Exclusive)
- Navigon 2100 Max
- Navigon 2120 Max
- Navigon 2200T
- Navigon 5100 Max
- Navigon 7200T
- Navigon 8100T
- Navigon iPhone app

==== Current North American Products ====
- Navigon MobileNavigator for the Android platform
- Navigon Europe, Navigon USA, and traffic4all apps for the Windows Phone platform

== Maps ==
The maps used by Navigon are provided by Navteq. Map errors are handled by the Navteq Map Reporter. Errors can be reported using Navigon's report map errors page and using the Navteq Map Reporter.

In June 2011, Navigon introduced a point of interest package derived from the crowdsourced OpenStreetMap project.

== Navigon Traffic Live ==
Navigon's iPhone Application, MobileNavigator is all set to receive the Live Traffic feature that is capable of warning users of upcoming traffic congestion and dynamically routing the user around it.

== Navigon app off the market ==
On May 14, 2018, Garmin took all navigation apps – except Garmin HUD EU/NA Apps – off the market. All Garmin turn-by-turn apps were affected, including NAVIGON, NAVIGON Regions, NAVIGON Cruiser, with NAVIGON select Telekom Edition to be removed on June 1, 2018.

== See also ==
- Automotive navigation system
- Comparison of commercial GPS software
- Garmin
- Magellan Navigation
- Satmap
- TomTom
- Traffic Message Channel
