= IGO (software) =

GPS navigation software

iGO Navigation

- Nav N Go iGO8
- Developer(s): NNG LLC
- Stable release: iGO My way 2009 / August 3, 2009; 15 years ago
- Operating system: Android, iOS, Windows CE, Windows Mobile
- Type: GPS navigation software
- Website: nng.com/products/nng-igo

The iGO Navigation Engine, developed by Hungary-based NNG LLC (formerly Nav N Go) is a GPS navigation software package. NNG sells some versions of the software directly to users, as well as to device manufacturers, auto makers, network operators and professional transport specialists. Products based on iGO are available in brands including Becker, Clarion, Pioneer, Samsung and Vodafone.

== Product history ==
iGO My way 2006 was the first GPS navigation software package by Nav N Go (now NNG) for PDA/PNA devices, introduced in 2005 at CeBIT, Hannover. Due to the new map compression technology, the product fits on a 1GB SD card. An improved version was iGO My way 2006 Plus, announced in 2006.

NNG's iGO 8 (for PDA/PNA devices) was released in April 2008. It offered high-definition 3D navigation maps of terrain, road elevation, landmarks and 3D buildings.

iGO amigo (for PNDs) was launched at CeBIT 2009 in Hannover. iGO amigo was the first in a new software series, and employed changes aimed at simplifying the user interface. Since iGO amigo was a streamlined release, it had fewer features than its predecessor iGO 8.

iGO My Way 2009 (for iOS devices) was released for North America and Western Europe and was then rolled out to all of Europe in 2010.

iGO Primo (for Apple iOS, PND/PNA devices), introduced in 2010, is as of 2015 the primary product of the iGO Navigation range. Version 6 was introduced at the end of 2012, with Google Local search, green routing, extras through in-app purchase, real-time traffic monitoring, TTS Pro speech synthesis, and 3D display of junctions.

iGO Primo app for iOS devices was introduced at CeBIT Hannover, 2011. Running on the iGO primo software engine, the refreshed application covers 115 countries with location-based search, green routing and improved junction views. Android and Windows Mobile versions are available to smartphone manufacturers and network providers, but not for retail sale.

iGO Primo Nextgen was introduced in 2015.

== Naviextras ==
Naviextras.com, NNG's map and content update portal, provides updates for iGO 8, iGO amigo and iGO primo. The portal typically releases map updates four times a year. Maps and updates are available for over 90 countries and regions, including countries from Europe, North America, South America, Africa, Middle East, Asia, and Oceania. In 2013, the portal supports 5.200 devices and counts close to 1.8 million registered users globally.

As NNG is an independent map provider, it works with several map suppliers in different geographical regions. There are different versions of maps running on the iGO Navigation software for the same country or region made by different map suppliers, including TomTom, HERE, Sensis and regional providers.

== Partnerships ==
In 2013, NNG partnered with Logicom, with an intention to provide the iGO navigation software services to the latter's mappy PNDs.

== See also ==
- Comparison of commercial GPS software
