= LRK =

Long Range Kinematic (LRK) technology is a sophisticated kinematic method developed by Magellan (formerly Thales) Navigation that optimises the advantages of dual-frequency GPS operation. Other conventional methods use the dual-frequency only during initialisation. LRK makes solving ambiguities during initialisation easy and continuous dual-frequency kinematic operation possible at distances up to 40 kilometres.

Conventional dual-frequency kinematic operation is limited to about 10 kilometres, using a combined observation on GPS L1 and L2 frequencies to produce an initial wide lane solution, ambiguous to around 86 centimetres. During a second phase, the conventional kinematic method uses measurements from the L1 frequency only. This method only allows for kinematic operation as long as the de-correlation of atmospheric errors is compatible with a pure phase single-frequency solution.

Similar to the KART process, LRK is a simple and reliable method that allows any initialisation mode, from a static or fixed reference point, to On The Fly ambiguity resolution, when performing dual-frequency GPS positioning. LRK technology reduces initialisation times to a few seconds by efficiently using L2 measurements in every mode of operation. LRK maintains optimal real-time positioning accuracy to within a centimetre at a range up to 40-50 kilometres, even with a reduced number of visible satellites.
