= Mio P550 =

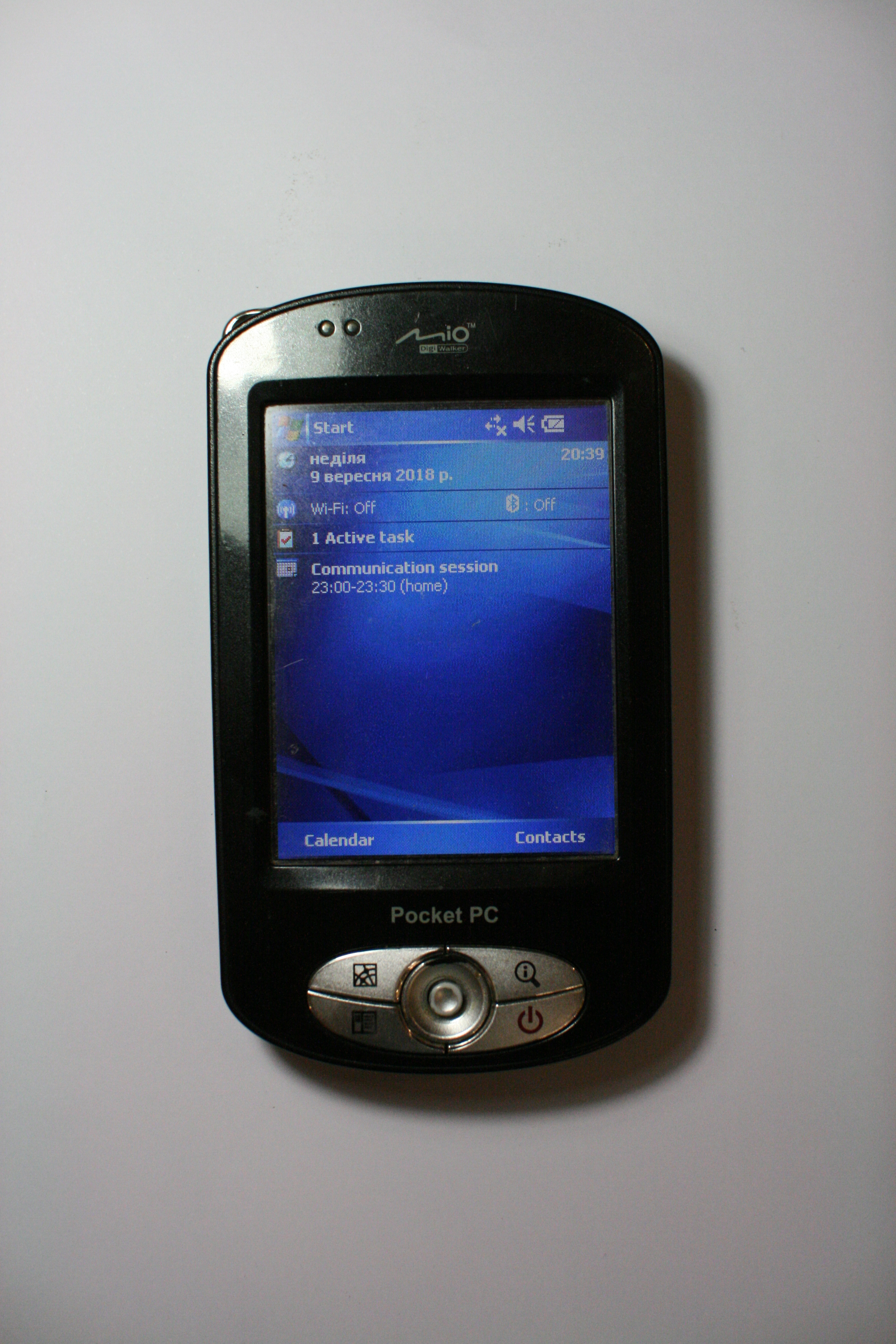
Mio P550, displaying the Today screen

The Mio P550 was one of two PDAs manufactured by Mio as a replacement for the aging Mio A201. The P550 was one of seven new devices showcased at CeBIT in March 2006. The Mio P550 was a member of Mio's discontinued "Digiwalker" product line, and runs on Windows Mobile 5, with Windows Media Player 10 for portables and portable Office.

The P550, in common with all other "Digiwalker" PDAs, supports GPS positioning, and features a built-in SiRFstarIII GPS chipset. The Mio P550 is essentially the same as the Mio P350, only differing in the inclusion of Bluetooth and Wi-Fi in the P550, and the difference of colour (the Mio P350 is silver-grey, while the Mio P550 is black). Inclusion of the extra Bluetooth and Wi-Fi antennas was blamed for initial poor GPS, (as compared to the P350), performance of the P550.

The P550 also features a 350 nit touch panel.
