= TeleType Co. =

TeleType Co, Inc.
- Industry: Technology
- Founded: 1981
- Headquarters: 44 School Street, Boston, Massachusetts 02108
- Area served: Worldwide
- Key people: Ed Friedman, President and co-founder; Marleen Winer, Vice-President and co-founder
- Products: GPS navigation software and devices
- Website: http://www.teletype.com

TeleType Co., Inc. is a privately held company in the United States that develops software for GPS devices. It was founded in 1981, under the name TeleTypesetting Company and it is based in Boston, Massachusetts. The company's product line includes automotive and commercial GPS navigation systems and other products including GPS receivers and tracking units. It develops and sells the WorldNav software for PC and Windows CE, tools for converting third-party maps into WorldNav maps, an SDK, and an API that allows the customization of the WorldNav application. TeleType Co. also offers consultancy services for those interested in acquiring and adapting the source code of their software products.

== History ==
=== Early years ===
The company was founded in 1981, in Ann Arbor, Michigan, under the name TeleTypesetting Company Inc., by Edward Friedman, a Licensed Professional Engineer, and Marleen Winer, an alumnus of the University of Maryland, holding a B.S. in Geography and a Master in Urban Planning from the University of Michigan. Ed Friedman was born in Odesa, Ukraine, and graduated from the Moscow Institute of Steel and Alloys (currently the National University of Science and Technology) with a B.S. in Transportation Engineering. He completed his studies in the U.S. with a Master of Science in Engineering at Michigan State University and an M.S. in Financial Management at the Polytechnic Institute. (currently New York University), completed requirements for a Ph.D. in Civil Engineering at the University of Michigan

The company was established in 1981 and initially operated in the phototypesetting industry. TeleTypesetting was one of the first companies to produce a hardware and software interface between personal computers such as the Apple II and IBM PS/2 and numerous models of phototypesetting machines such as the Compugraphic Compuwriter, and CompEdit, and Varityper EPICS, Comp/Set and Comp/Edit. TeleTypesetting Co. created a package called MicroSetter, composed of a desk accessory, cables, conversion software, and connectivity software, which provided computers equipped with the capability to connect to phototypesetting machines. MicroSetter was compatible with numerous desktop publishing applications such as Ready, Set, Go!, PageMaker, Microsoft Word, MacWrite, and MacDraw. The use of personal computers took advantage of functions such as spell checking and printing on plain paper before printing on expensive phototypesetting paper which could not easily be corrected after the photographic process was completed thereby saving time and expense while providing more accurate results. From the MicroSetter product line evolved the T-Script PostScript interpreter (also referred to in the industry as a Raster image processor) which converted output from popular PostScript-based WYSIWYG (What You See Is What You Get) programs such as PageMaker, Microsoft Word, and MacWrite to non-PostScript printers which were much more economical at the time. This provided the user the ability to see the document on the screen as it would appear on the printer.

=== Digital books ===
The company later expanded to application development and launched "Books that Remember". Taking advantage of the emerging personal digital assistant (PDA) capabilities, the company produced a series of digital books that could be used in interactive ways based on the computing power of the devices. It published applications designed for Apple's series of PDAs, the Newton. This included Digital Gourmet, a cooking book application aimed at professional chefs, built on the HyperCard programming environment. The application utilized HyperCard's capabilities to calculate the nutritional values of the prepared foods based on the ingredients used. Since 2003, the application has been released to the community as freeware.

=== Global Positioning System integration ===
The company recognized the simplicity and convenience of using PDAs for navigation purposes and used its experience in this domain to create its first GPS navigation software, which later evolved into a line of portable GPS devices. Seeking to combine the computing power of PDAs such as Newton with the advanced capabilities of GPS technology, TeleType created an application that served as an aid to navigation for aircraft pilots. This software gave the pilots the ability to create flight plans and avoid restricted areas, using the large touch screen Newton rather than the complicated button-oriented small-screen handheld systems offered at that time. Later, the company expanded its aviation product to include street maps so that pilots could use the same device for flying and driving by easily switching from aviation mode to street mode.
In 1998, TeleType Co. began marketing its GPS navigation software, targeting handheld devices running on the Windows CE operating system. The software was compatible with many types of devices, including PDAs and Pocket PCs. The software could also be installed on PCs running Windows 95/NT. In 1999 a software product addressed to airplane pilots was launched that added specific functionalities such as runway details and radio frequencies.
In the late 1990s and early 2000 the company partnered with Geographic Data Technologies (GDT) which was later acquired by TeleAtlas, one of the market leaders for digitized maps, an agreement that made street-level maps of U.S., Canada, and 14 European countries available to TeletType Co. The company implemented these maps in its navigation solutions for the Apple Newton and Windows and Windows CE-based systems. Currently the company partners with Navteq for U.S., Canada, and Mexico mapping. TeleType continued its development efforts offering the first solution to combine land, air, and water navigation in one integrated program. The company expanded to create a vehicle tracking solution called PocketTracker, combining GPS tracking and navigation in a Windows CE-based PDA. The solution was launched in 2001. The software took advantage of the CDPD technology, one of the first wireless data technologies, allowing users to track in real-time the positions of devices running TeleType's software and hardware.
From 2000 to 2007 the company introduced a series of portable navigation devices for street navigation. In 2008, TeleType launched one of the first GPS solutions aimed specifically at commercial drivers. The WorldNav Truck GPS product line began with a 3.5" touchscreen GPS with the unique feature of interactively showing restricted roads in a bright pink color based on the size and weight of the vehicle in use. The company then expanded the line to include 5" and 7" screens. This product line takes into account commercial restrictions and low bridge heights among other features when calculating routes.

== Product line ==
=== GPS navigation systems and Mobile Apps for commercial vehicles ===
TeleType manufactures a series of GPS devices aimed at professional drivers, such as truckers and bus drivers. The devices operate on the Windows CE operating system and are powered by a SiRFstarIII GPS chipset. When calculating routes, the WorldNav software installed on the devices takes into account commercial truck restrictions such as bridge heights, load limits, one-way roads, and Hazmat restrictions. The systems also allow custom routing based on the vehicle's dimensions. TeleType Co. holds a pending patent (US 2010/0057358) for this custom routing technology The WorldNav software is preloaded with over 12 million points of interest, which TeleType claims to be the highest number in the industry.

The selection of the points of interest is oriented towards professional drivers, and it includes gas stations, truck stops, and weigh stations. The WorldNav offers the unique feature of searching for points of interest by the business telephone number.

In 2012 TeleType developed and introduced the SmartTruckRoute app to provide navigation for commercial drivers seeking up-to-date mapping and truck-specific routing for Android and iOS smartphones.

=== GPS devices for land, air, and water navigation ===
TeleType also offers a line of GPS navigation devices aimed at the consumer market. The non-commercial line of portable GPS devices includes over 12 million points of interest with the unique feature of searching for points of interest by the business telephone number. Restaurants, hotels, airports, and other basic points of interest are included. These devices have received generally favorable reviews, being praised for their GPS reception, text-to-speech functions, and a large database of points of interest. A specialized device targeting motorcyclists and bicyclists is outfitted with a custom version of the navigation software which allows users to create their off-road routes and has a specialized electronic keyboard making it easy to use while wearing gloves. In addition to GPS navigation devices for land vehicles, TeleType offers versions of its WorldNav software customized for air and marine navigation.

=== Special GPS systems ===
Other specialized GPS devices offered by TeleType include GPS receivers, vehicle-mountable GPS trackers, and other specialty items.

== Developer tools ==
TeleType offers software development kits for its WorldNav navigation software allowing developers full control over the integration of their specialized software solutions with navigation. The tools support Windows and Windows CE embedded devices. Developers have access to functions of the WorldNav navigation software allowing routes to be created, analyzed, and pushed directly to the device of choice. TeleType's solutions have been used for projects such as creating an automated taxi dispatch service. The company also offers map development tools allowing clients to convert their digital mapping information into the TeleType proprietary map format (TTM) for use in TeleType navigation software.

== Awards and recognitions ==
TeleType Co.'s product WorldNavigator has received CNET's Editor's Choice in 2003 and 2004.
