= National Number Group =

Area division of telephone network

The UK Public Switched Telephone Network is divided up by area into National Number Groups (NNG's), and then further divided up into dialling codes.

The structure of UK telephone numbers is a leading zero (replaced with +44 for international calls from outside the UK) followed by the NNG — a 2, 3, 4 or 5 digit dialling code (digits SA in the example below) to different geographic areas of the UK.

e.g.

Telephone number (020) 7811 8055 is part of the "London Area" and so has NNG 2078:

0	S	A	B	C	D	E	F	G	H	I
0	2	0	7	8	1	1	8	0	5	5
