= Magellan Navigation =

American producer of global positioning systems

- Type: Private
- Industry: Technology
- Founded: 1986
- Headquarters: 279 E Arrow Hwy, San Dimas, California 91773
- Products: GPS receivers, mapping software
- Parent: MiTAC
- Website: MagellanGPS.com

Magellan Navigation, Inc. is an American producer of consumer and professional grade Global Positioning System receivers, named after Ferdinand Magellan, the first explorer to circumnavigate the globe. Headquartered in San Dimas, California, with European sales and engineering centres in Nantes, France and Moscow, Russia, Magellan also produces aftermarket automotive GPS units, including the Hertz Neverlost system found in Hertz rental cars. The Maestro, RoadMate, Triton, and eXplorist lines are Magellan's current consumer offerings. The company also produces proprietary road maps (DirectRoute), topographic maps (Topo), and marine charts (BlueNav) for use with its consumer GPS receivers.

== History ==
Magellan started as an independent company. It was once owned by Orbital Sciences Corporation, which purchased it in 1994. In 2001, Thales Group purchased the Magellan division of Orbital Sciences for about $70 million and the company became known as Thales Navigation. Five years later, private equity firm Shah Capital Partners and other investors purchased Thales Navigation for $170 million and the company was officially renamed Magellan Navigation.

Magellan was the creator of the Magellan NAV 100, the world's first commercial handheld GPS receiver, which debuted in 1989. In 1997, Magellan also introduced the first handheld global satellite communicator, the GSC 100. Later consumer handheld products included the Magellan GPS 2000, GPS 315, Meridian, SporTrak, and Magellan RoadMate models. The MobileMapper CE and ProMark3 have been marketed to professionals like surveyors and Geographic Information System (GIS) users.

The consumer division of Magellan was purchased by Mio Technology subsidiary of MiTAC on December 15, 2008, who changed the name to "MiTAC Digital Corporation".

== Consumer products ==
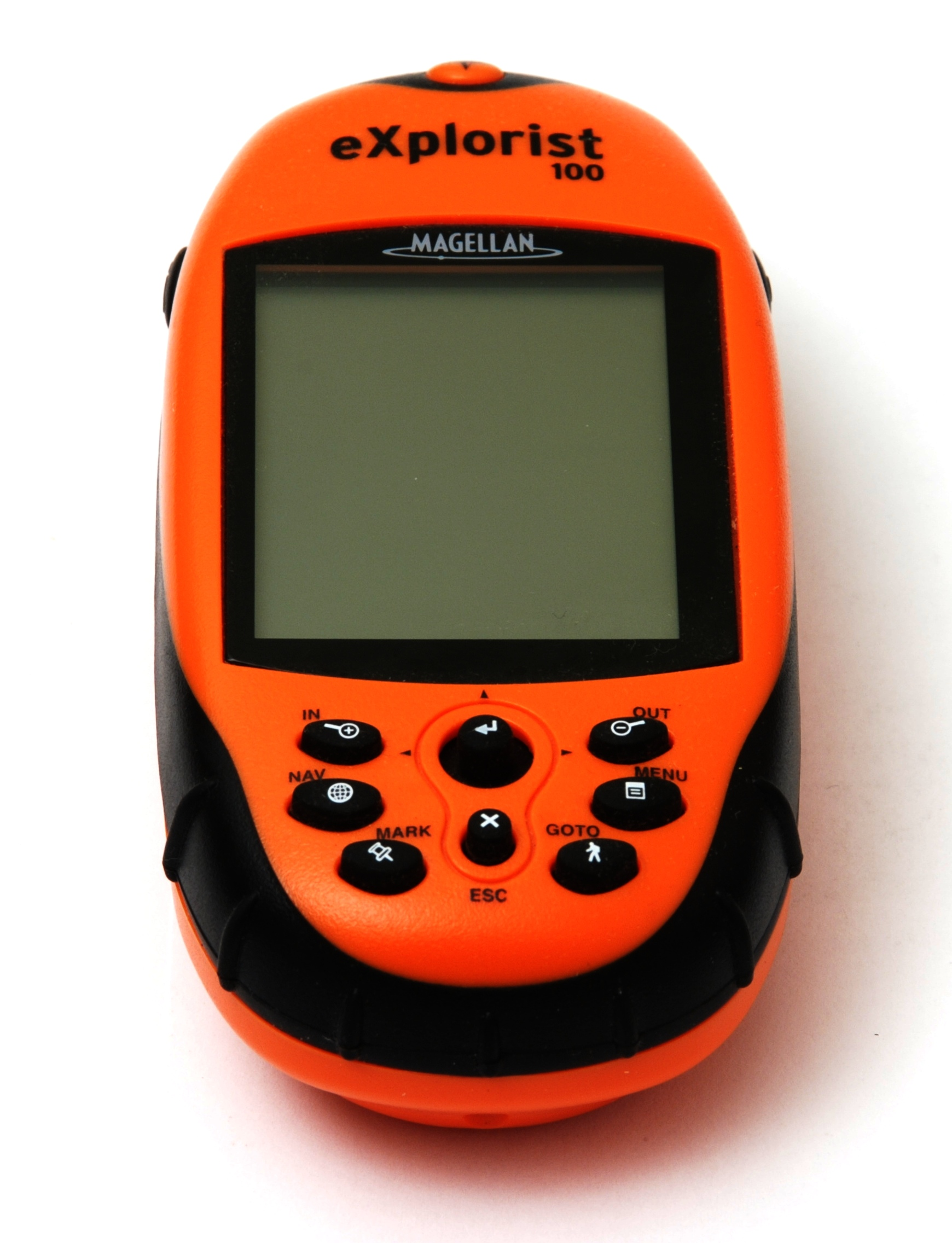
Magellan eXplorist 100 GPS

Magellan develops and distributes vehicle navigation, crossover GPS, and outdoor handheld navigation products. The company also produces customized mapping software for topographic, marine, and street navigation.

Current GPS products as of 2016 include:

- The Magellan RoadMate and Magellan Maestro series of portable car navigation systems
- The Magellan CrossoverGPS for automobile and handheld navigation
- The Magellan eXplorist and Magellan Triton series of outdoor handheld navigation devices
- The Hertz NeverLost car navigation system
- The Magellan TRX Off-Road navigation systems

Magellan GPS units include a variety of different viewing options, including a 3D bird's-eye view, a night view, and pop-up visuals of upcoming turns. Some models use SiRFstarIII for position accuracy within three metres, and voice and onscreen prompts that provide directions on how to drive to a particular destination. Certain Magellan vehicle navigation systems are also Bluetooth-compatible for integration with mobile phones, and traffic upgradeable for real-time traffic information. The Maestro 4050 is the first portable vehicle navigation device to offer drivers the convenience of voice command capabilities. The Company has a partnership with AAA that provides drivers with AAA TourBook guide travel information, AAA Member Roadside Assistance details, and AAA Show Your Card & Save Member Discount locations on specific models.

== Maps ==
Magellan products currently use Navteq based maps. Map errors are handled by the Navteq Map Reporter. Errors can be reported using the Navteq Map Reporter map feedback page.

== See also ==
- Automotive navigation system
- Garmin
- GLONASS
- Map database management
- Navigon
- Point of interest
- Satmap
- TeleType Co.
- TomTom
