= Personal navigation assistant =

Portable combination positioning and navigation system

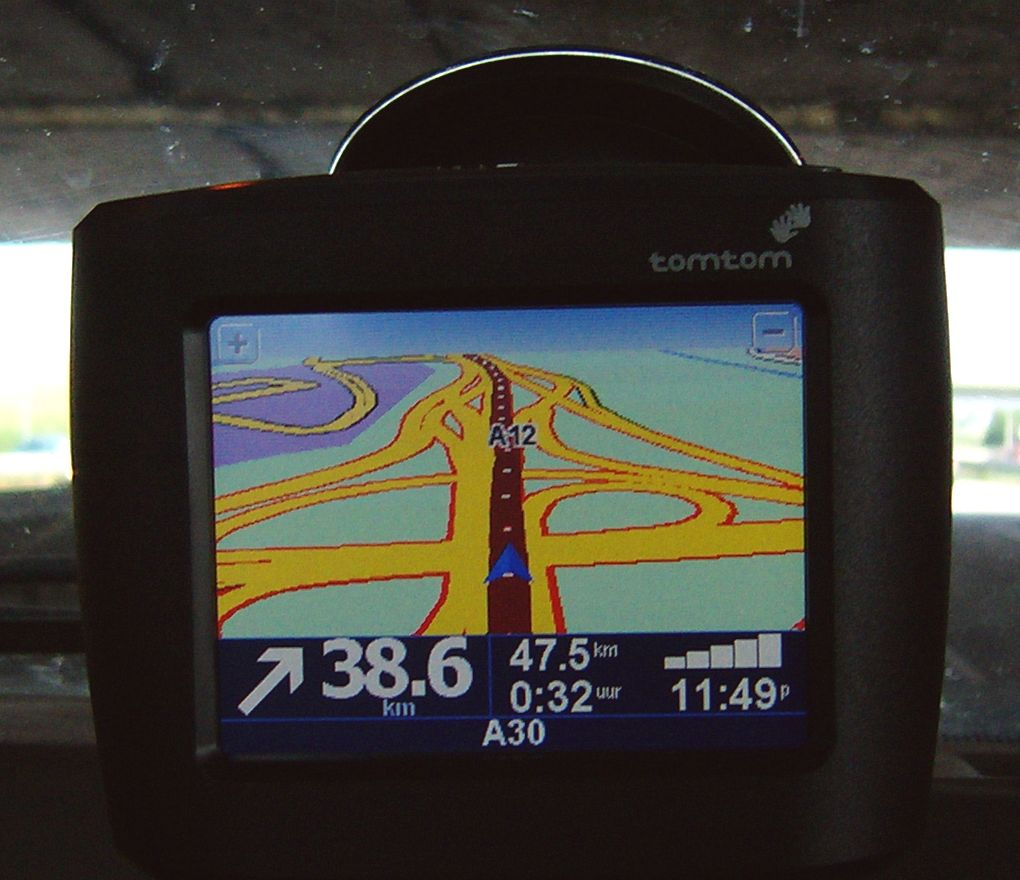
Example of a personal navigation assistant.

A Personal Navigation Assistant (PNA) also known as Personal Navigation Device or Portable Navigation Device (PND) is a portable electronic product which combines a positioning capability (such as GPS) and navigation functions.

Some PNA devices are PDA with limited features and can be unlocked.

== History ==
The earliest PNAs were hand-held GPS units (circa mid-1980s) which were capable of displaying the user's location on an electronic map. These units included simple navigation functions such as course-to-steer and course-made-good. This first generation of PNAs were used by the US military.

== Market developments ==
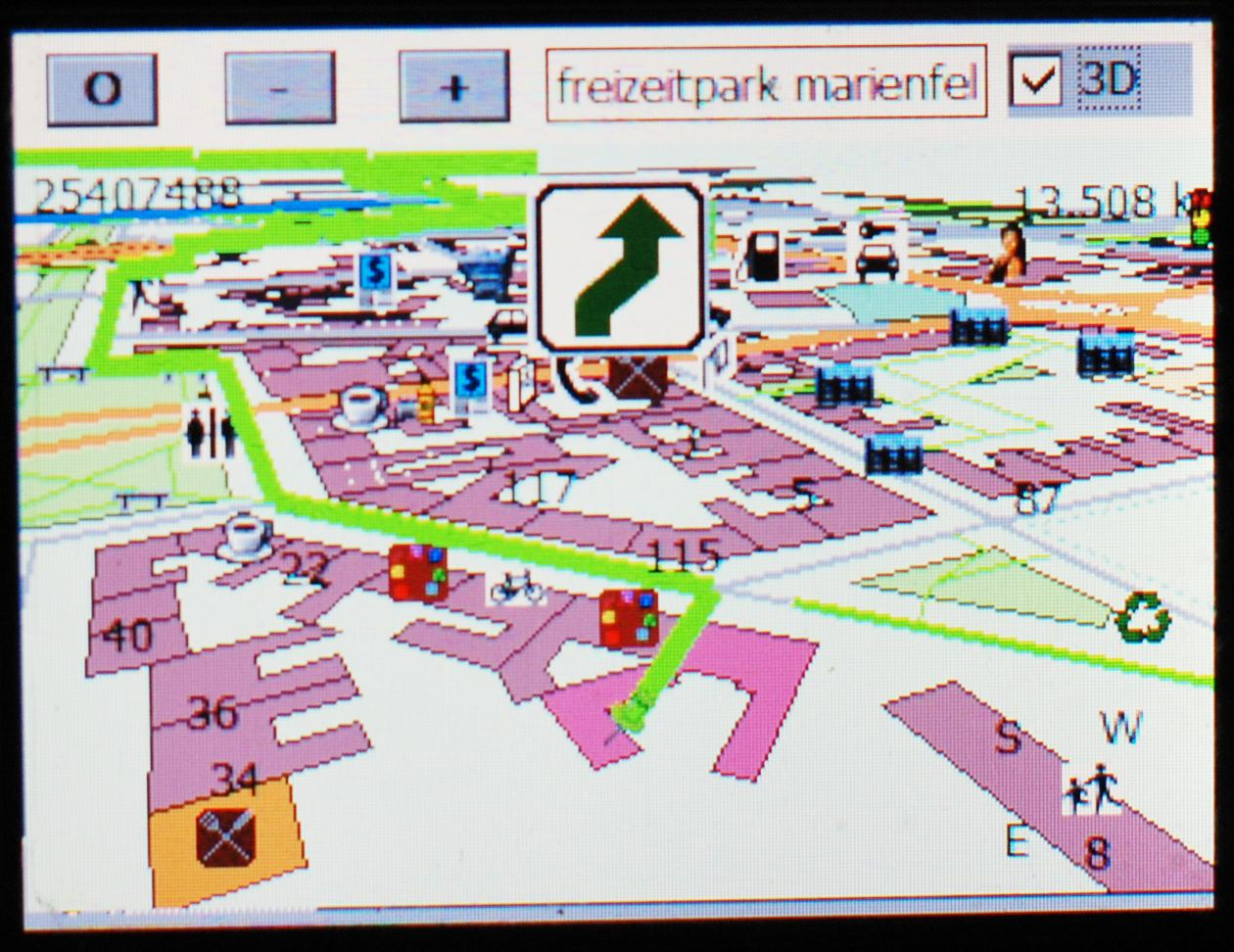
Bicycle navigation on a personal navigation assistant.

According to the analyst firm Berg Insight, there were more than 150 million turn-by-turn navigation systems worldwide in mid-2009, including about 35 million factory installed and aftermarket in-dash navigation systems, over 90 million Personal Navigation Devices (PNDs) and an estimated 28 million navigation-enabled mobile handsets with GPS.

The term PNA has come into widespread use with the growing popularity of automobile navigation systems. Original PNAs provided users with a map layer, real-time-traffic, and a routing engine with audio/visual cues for turn-by-turn guidance. The latest generation of PNAs have sophisticated navigation functions such as parking assistance and personalization engines that enhance the user experience. To reduce total cost of ownership and time to market, most modern PNA devices such as those made by Garmin Ltd., Mio Technology Ltd. or TomTom International BV. are running an off-the-shelf embedded operating system such as Windows CE or Embedded Linux on commodity hardware with OEM versions of popular PDA Navigation software packages such as TomTom Navigator, I-GO 2006, Netropa IntelliNav iGuidance, or Destinator.

Other manufacturers such as Garmin and Magellan prefer to bundle their own software developed in-house. Because many of these devices use an embedded OS, many technically inclined users find it easy to modify PNAs to run third party software and use them for things other than navigation, such as a low-cost audio-video player or PDA replacement.

GPS equipped mobile phones have now eclipsed the sale of dedicated GPS units. Nokia, Samsung Electronics, Motorola and other handset makers were predicted to sell 162 million GPS equipped phones in 2007, dwarfing the 20 million units Garmin and TomTom have forecast they will sell combined, according to iSuppli, a leading market researcher in California. The inclusion of Google Maps Navigation in Android devices such as Motorola Droid and Nokia's announcement of free Ovi Maps has led to many people using their smartphones instead of having a separate PNA for trip navigation.

== Motorized vehicle navigation ==
Systems designed for automobiles are able to calculate routes taking into account the road network, and sometimes in real time: their popularity has led to the wide spread of navigation assistants.

On some devices, the user can define the place of arrival by his postal address (and no longer only by his geographical coordinates), and sometimes with the name of the place. Instructions are often given step by step, with directional pictograms commented on by a voice synthesis system.

The navigator then gives route suggestions that the driver can follow when they are relevant. Sometimes, these navigation systems use incorrect data (Map not adapted to the vehicle or not updated, canyon effect, etc.) generating erroneous information, and the driver who follows them blindly can cause an accident which can be fatal, in particular for heavy vehicles: coaches and other heavy goods vehicles. Thus, the systems display alerts warning the user of these possible errors.

Some navigators are specialized for heavy goods vehicles and take into account the size of the vehicles but also their mass and dimensions, in order to only offer itineraries using suitable roads. On the other hand, other applications for the general public, such as Waze or Coyote, are unable to give a route including all the constraints that this type of vehicle must follow (including mass and height) to truck drivers.

=== Features ===
Some versions are very complete, and can offer:

- three-dimensional maps.
- entry of the arrival address by voice recognition, and sometimes only with the name of the place.
- a calculation of the route taking into account constraints in real time (traffic jams, road works, weather conditions, etc.), the data being provided directly by a connection integrated into the vehicle (Renault R-Link for example), or, in the case of a mobile application, by the cellular data of the smartphone;
- a radarGPS service with communication features. Thanks to a SIM card and mobile networks, the user benefits from information updated in real time and very regularly, without any intervention on the part of the user. This feature also makes it possible to alert on the presence of radars (fixed and mobile), police controls, to inform about the state of the traffic, the weather, or even carpooling, etc. The leaders in the field offer connected devices: TomTom LIVE (integrated with Renault R-Link), Garmin 1690, Medion, Navigon LIVE, Goodkap! with Coyote, Avertinoo and Camsam with Munic. Note that most mobile navigation applications (Maps, Google Maps, Waze, etc.) offer proprietary systems of this type. So there is a limit to this: a little-used system application will be unable to function properly, and to provide information in real time.

== See also ==
- GPS navigation device
- Personal digital assistant
- Car navigation
- Traffic Message Channel
