= Satmap =

GPS producer in the United Kingdom

Satmap Systems Ltd.
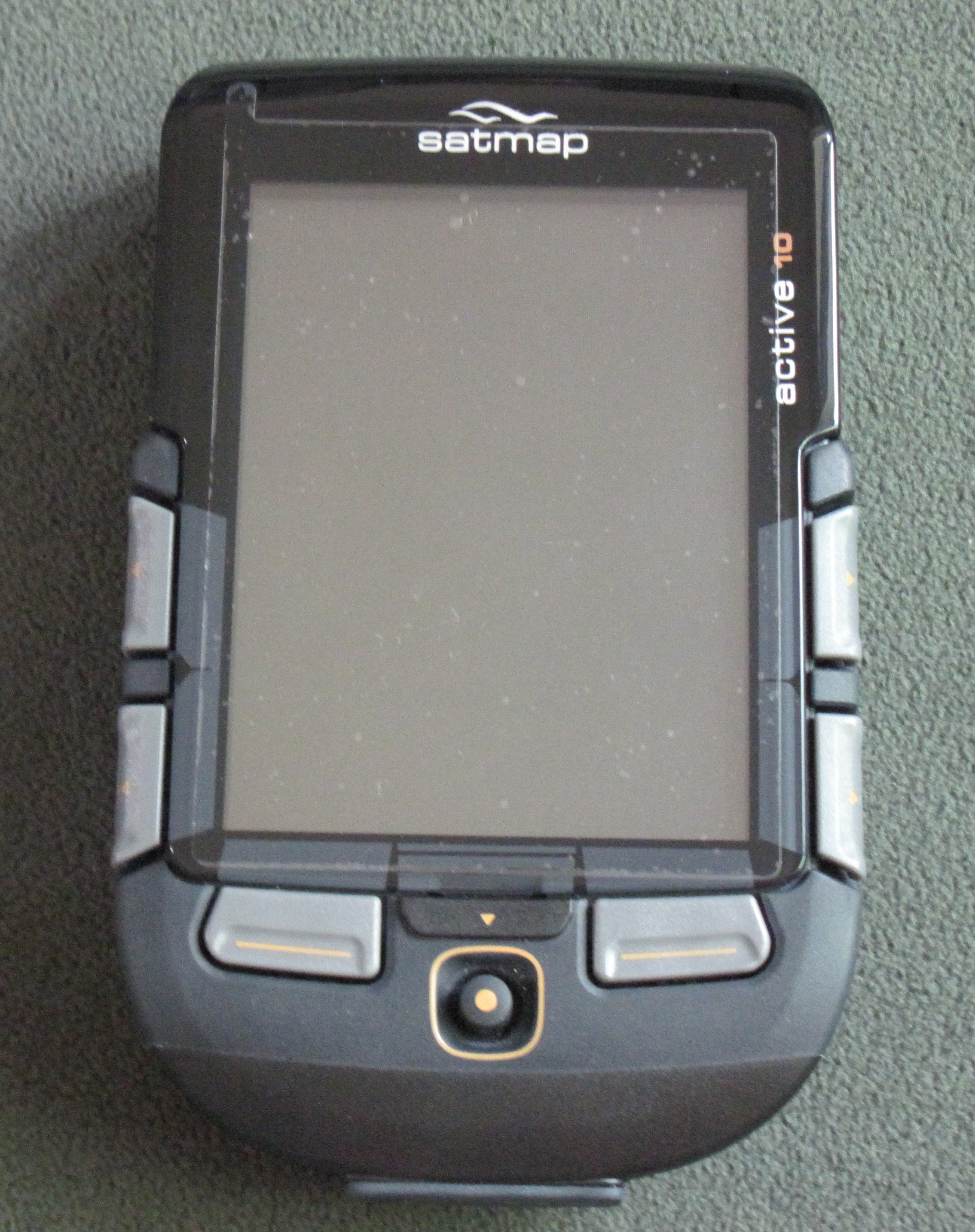
- Satmap Active 10
- Industry: Technology
- Founded: Leatherhead, Surrey, United Kingdom (2005)
- Headquarters: Cleeve Road, Leatherhead
- Key people: Howard Dyson, Stephen Cann (Directors)
- Products: GPS receivers, Global Digital Mapping
- Website: www.satmap.com

Satmap Systems Limited is a United Kingdom company founded on 19 October 2005 and based in Leatherhead, Surrey. Since 2007 it has produced a standalone handheld GPS satellite navigation mapping device for use by walkers, cyclists, mountain rescue, emergency services and the military.

The company closed in 2022.

== Active 10 ==
The Active 10 available since 2007 is sold in four different bundles:

- Active 10 (the device, a case, a lanyard and three lithium AA batteries).
- Active 10 BIKE (the device, a bike mount and a power pack including adaptors and a 2700mAh lithium polymer rechargeable battery.
- Active 10 PLUS GB (the device, a case, a lanyard, a power pack including adaptors and a 2700mAh lithium polymer rechargeable battery, the UK GB 1:50,000 Ordnance Survey map).
- Active 10 PLUS EU (the device, a case, a lanyard, a power pack including adaptors and a 2700mAh lithium polymer rechargeable battery, a Europe map).

== Active 12 ==
The Active 12 introduced in 2014 is more technically advanced than the Active 10 with a High-Resolution 320x488 pixel HVGA screen, doubled RAM, Bluetooth and a barometric altimeter and it is supplied with a high resolution UK GB 1:50,000 map. It is virtually identical in appearance to the Active 10 but is distinguishable by its orange buttons.

== Accessories ==
Accessories include a vehicle mount, silicone protective cases and screen covers. It is necessary to swap the caddy holding the batteries to change the power source. Detailed maps can be loaded on to the device by inserting an SD card into the side, 350 map titles from 13 countries are available including; 1:25,000 and 1:50,000 scale Ordnance Survey maps, Harvey Maps, a 1:16,000 A-Z street maps of London and other UK cities, marine maps, United States, Canada, Australia, Europe and Morocco maps.

== See also ==
- Garmin
- Magellan Navigation
- MapKing
- Navigon
- TomTom
