= Time to first fix =

Time required for a GPS receiver to acquire a position

Time to first fix (TTFF) is a measure of the time required for a GPS navigation device to acquire satellite signals and navigation data, and calculate a position solution (called a fix).

An animation depicting the orbits of GPS satellites in medium Earth orbit

== Scenarios ==
The TTFF is commonly broken down into three more specific scenarios, as defined in the GPS equipment guide:

Cold or factory
The receiver is missing or has inaccurate estimates of its position, velocity, the time, or the visibility of any of the GPS satellites. As such, the receiver must systematically search for all possible satellites. After acquiring a satellite signal, the receiver can begin to obtain approximate information on all the other satellites, called the almanac. This almanac is transmitted repeatedly over 12.5 minutes. Almanac data can be received from any of the GPS satellites and is considered valid for up to 180 days.
Warm or normal
The receiver has estimates of the current time within 20 seconds, the current position within 100 kilometers, its velocity within 25 m/s, and it has valid almanac data. It must acquire each satellite signal and obtain that satellite's detailed orbital information, called ephemeris data. Each satellite broadcasts its ephemeris data every 30 seconds with validity of up to 4 hours.
Hot or standby
The receiver has valid time, position, almanac, and ephemeris data, enabling a rapid acquisition of satellite signals. The time required of a receiver in this state to calculate a position fix may also be termed time to subsequent fix (TTSF).

Many receivers can use as many as twelve channels simultaneously, allowing quicker fixes (especially in a cold case for the almanac download). Many cell phones reduce the time to first fix by using assisted GPS (A-GPS): they acquire almanac and ephemeris data over a fast network connection from the cell-phone operator rather than over the slow radio connection from the satellites.

The TTFFs for a cold start is typically between 2 and 4 minutes, a warm start is 45 seconds (or shorter), and a hot start is 22 seconds (or only a few seconds). In older hardware where satellite search is slower, a cold start may take more than the full 12.5 minutes.

== See also ==
- Global Positioning System (GPS)
- GPS signals
- High-sensitivity GPS
- Satellite navigation solution
