= SiRFstarIII =

Range of GPS microcontroller chips

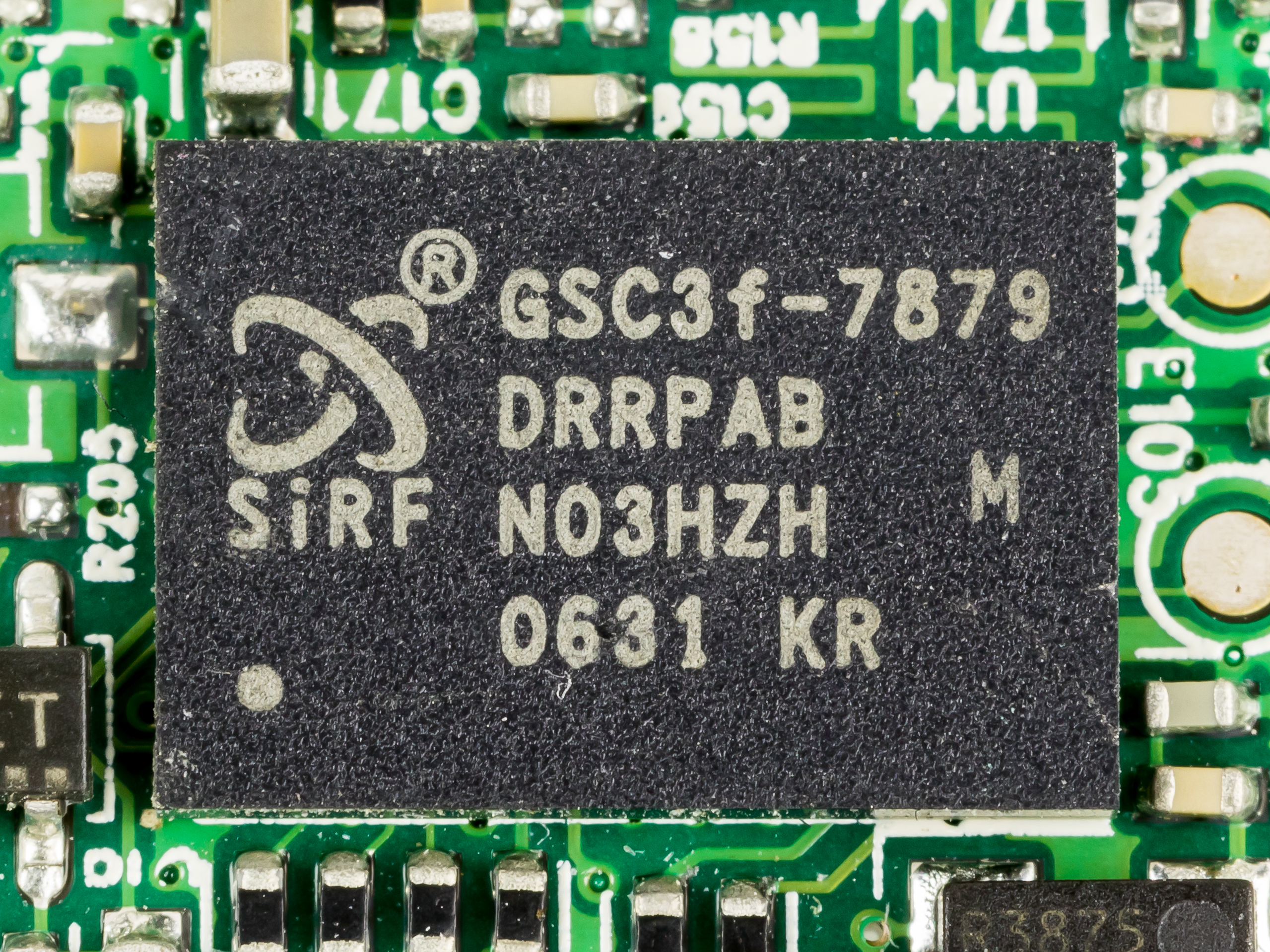
SiRFstarIII GSC3f

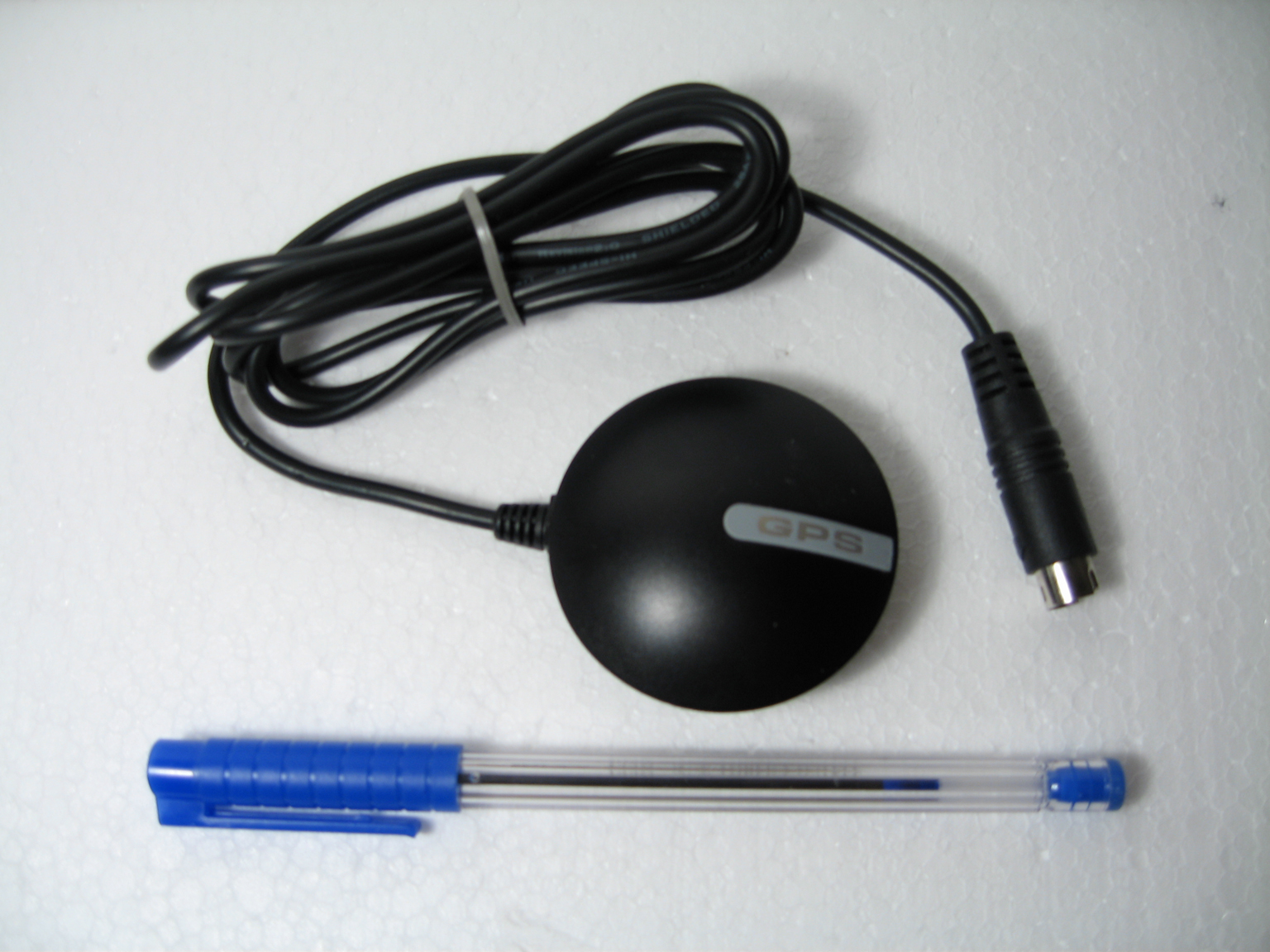
SiRFstarIII chip based 20-channel GPS receiver with WAAS/EGNOS support

SiRFstarIII is a range of high sensitivity GPS microcontroller chips manufactured by SiRF Technology. GPS microcontroller chips interpret signals from GPS satellites and determine the position of the GPS receiver. It was announced in 2004.

== Features ==
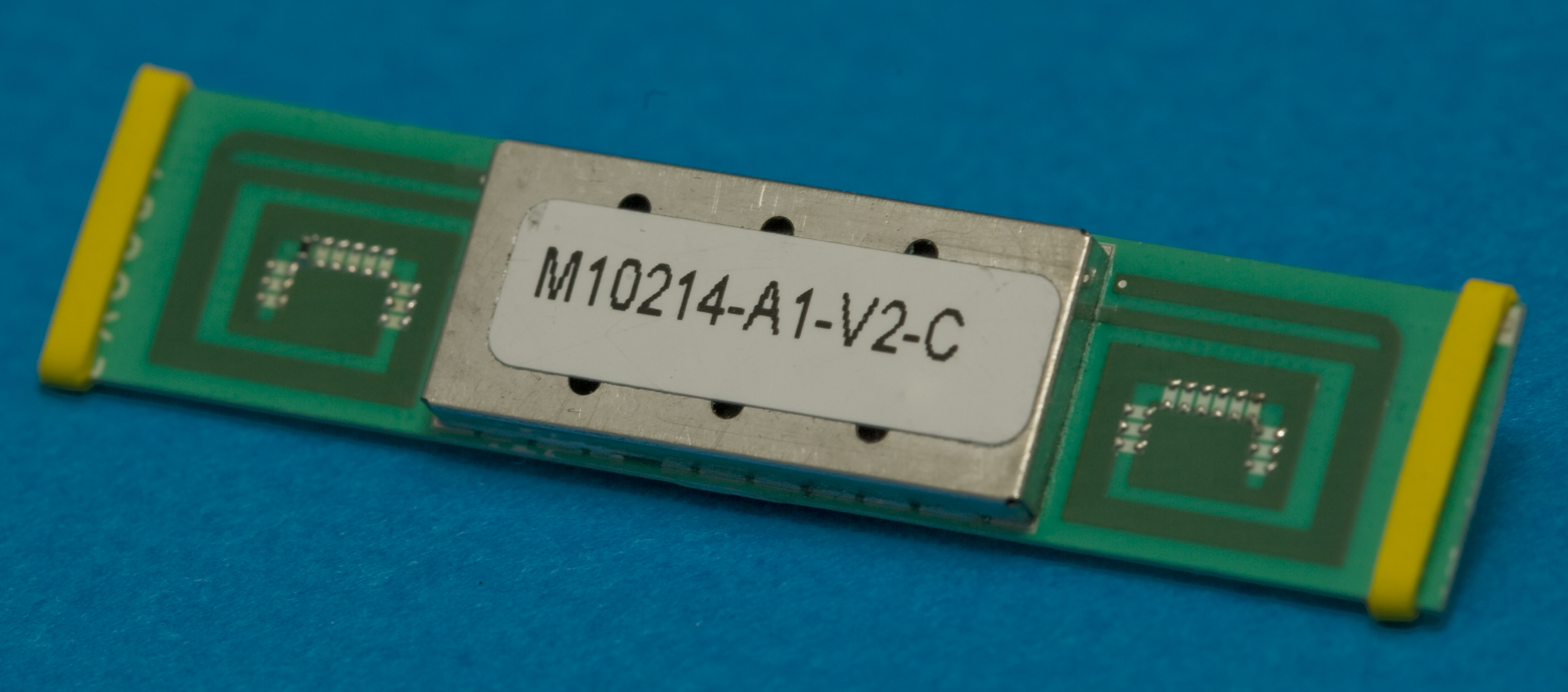
SiRFstar III receiver and integrated antenna from UK company Antenova. This measures just 49×9×4 mm.

SiRFstarIII features:

- A 20-channel receiver, which can process the signals of all visible GPS and WAAS satellites simultaneously.
- Power consumption of 62 mW during continuous operation.
- Assisted GPS client capability can reduce TTFF to less than one second.
- Receiver sensitivity of -159 dBm while tracking.
- SBAS (WAAS, MSAS, EGNOS) support

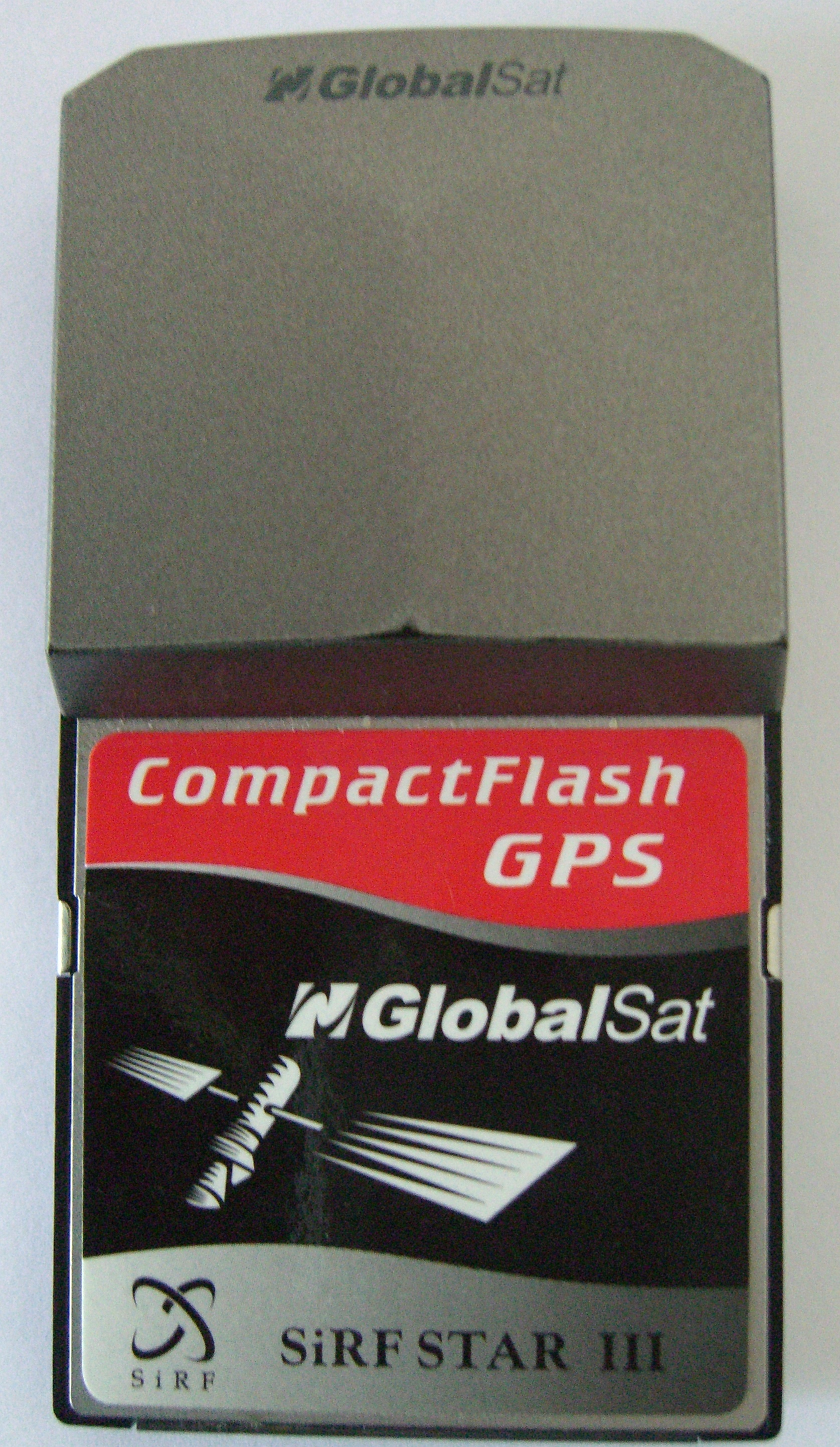
CompactFlash SirfStar III receiver
