= Outline of road transport =

Collective term for all forms of transport which takes place on roads

The following outline is provided as an overview of and topical guide to road transport:

Road transport or road transportation is a type of transport using roads. Transport on roads can be roughly grouped into the transportation of goods and transportation of people. In many countries licensing requirements and safety regulations ensure a separation of the two industries. Movement along roads may be by bike, automobile, bus, truck, or by animal such as horse or oxen. Standard networks of roads were adopted by Romans, Persians, Aztec, and other early empires, and may be regarded as a feature of empires. Cargo may be transported by trucking companies, while passengers may be transported via mass transit. Commonly defined features of modern roads include defined lanes and signage. Various classes of road exist, from two-lane local roads with at-grade intersections to controlled-access highways with all cross traffic grade-separated.

The nature of road transportation of goods depends on, apart from the degree of development of the local infrastructure, the distance the goods are transported by road, the weight and volume of an individual shipment, and the type of goods transported. For short distances and light small shipments, a van or pickup truck may be used. For large shipments even if less than a full truckload a truck is more appropriate. (Also see Trucking and Hauling below). In some countries cargo is transported by road in horse-drawn carriages, donkey carts or other non-motorized mode. Delivery services are sometimes considered a separate category from cargo transport. In many places, fast food is transported on roads by various types of vehicles. For inner city delivery of small packages and documents bike couriers are quite common.

== What type of thing is road transport? ==
Road transport can be described as all of the following:

- Technology
  - A form of transport

== Types of road transport ==
- Road transport
- Accompanied combined transport
- Air ferry
- Animal transporter
- Auto transport broker
- Autonomous mobility on demand
- Car shuttle train
- Combined transport
- Convoy
- Drive-in
- Drive-through
- Oversize load
- Oversize permit
- Pedelec
- Showman's road locomotive
- Slow moving vehicle

== History of road transport ==
History of road transport

- Historic roads and trails

== Road infrastructure ==
- Road
  - Highway
- Base course
- California bearing ratio
- Cellular confinement
- Subgrade
- Blind corner
- Curb extension
- Guard rail
- Guide rail
- Traffic barrier
- Grit bin
- High injury network
- High-mast lighting
- Maintenance of traffic
- Permanently signed detour route
- Police escort
- Right of way
- Speed bump
- Staging area
- Vertical queue
- Zero fatality corridor
- Shoulder (road)
- Roadworks
- Roadway noise
- Road salt
- Private highway
- Private road
- Loose chippings
- Sump buster
- Hairpin turn
- Horseshoe curve
- Parting stone
- Electric road
- Fingerpost
- Exit number

== Road design and planning ==
- Design speed
- Operating speed
- Functional classification
- Road hierarchy
- Street hierarchy
- Grid plan
- Radial plan
- Concurrency (road)
- Context-sensitive solutions
- Inner–outer directions
- Road expansion
- Freeway removal
- Free-market roads
- Glossary of road transport terms
- Detour

== Road traffic ==
- Traffic
- Traffic flow
- Fundamental diagram of traffic flow
- Three-phase traffic theory
- Three-detector problem and Newell's method
- Traffic wave
- Traffic bottleneck
- Traffic break
- Traffic calming
- Traffic congestion
- Traffic congestion reconstruction with Kerner's three-phase theory
- Traffic count
- Traffic reporting
- Gridlock
- Intersection capacity utilization
- Left- and right-hand traffic
- Equestrian use of roadways

== Road safety ==
- Road safety
- Braking distance
- Following distance
- List of countries by traffic-related death rate
- Roadkill
- Stopping sight distance
- Total stopping distance
- Vehicular homicide
- Worker road safety

== Road operations and management ==
- Highway network optimization
- Free-market roads
- Road expansion
- Freeway removal

== Vehicle technology ==
- Automatic vehicle location
- Autonomous mobility on demand
- Baby on board
- Barrier transfer machine
- Braking test track
- Bullbar
- Fleet controlling
- Fleet telematics system
- Pedestrian safety through vehicle design
- Tachograph
- Vehicle infrastructure integration
- Vehicle inspection
- Vehicle tracking system

== Traffic management ==
- Bicycle counter
- Downs–Thomson paradox
- Google Traffic
- Hours of service
- Hours of Work and Rest Periods (Road Transport) Convention, 1939
- Hours of Work and Rest Periods (Road Transport) Convention, 1979
- Jaywalking
- Lewis–Mogridge position
- Nericell
- Njection
- Non-motorist
- Non-motorized access on freeways
- Open road tolling
- Pedestrian scramble
- Rat running
- Roadside assistance
- Road trip
- Traffic ticket
- Travelers' information station

== Road transport government agencies ==
- Albanian Road Authority
- Anas (company)
- Bangladesh Road Transport Authority
- Bihar State Road Development Corporation
- Consorzio per le Autostrade Siciliane
- Department for Infrastructure and Transport
- Department of Transport (Tamil Nadu)
- Department of Transport and Main Roads
- DfI Roads
- Expressway Authority of Thailand
- Federal Works Agency
- Finnish Transport Infrastructure Agency
- General Directorate for National Roads and Motorways
- Ghana Highways Authority
- Highway authority in the United States
- Hyderabad Road Development Corporation Limited
- Icelandic Road Administration
- Kano Road Traffic Agency
- Madhya Pradesh Road Development Corporation Limited
- National Highways
- National Highways and Infrastructure Development Corporation Limited
- National Highways Authority of India
- National Roads Authority
- Norwegian Public Roads Administration
- Pakhtunkhwa Highways Authority
- Punjab Highway Department
- Regional Transport Office
- Rijkswaterstaat
- Rivers State Roads Maintenance and Rehabilitation Agency
- Highway authority
- Regional associations of road authorities
- Road Development Authority
- Rivers State Road Traffic Management Authority
- Road Transport Authority (Myanmar)
- Roads Committee
- Société Nationale des Autoroutes du Maroc
- Swedish Road Administration
- Transport for NSW
- Transport Infrastructure Ireland
- Transport Malta
- Transport Scotland
- Uganda National Roads Authority
- Vejdirektoratet
- VicRoads

== Road transport organizations ==
- ELTIS
- GEWI
- Roadgeek

== Road transport publications ==
- ELTIS
- GEWI

== Road transport facilities ==
- Drive-through
- Drive-in
- Museum of Technology and Transport
- NATRAX
- Pre-purchase inspection
- Rear services
- Ride-sharing bench
- Street reclamation
- Truck stop

== Road transport issues ==
- Externalities of cars
- Peak car
- Road expansion
- Societal effects of cars
