= Gregory's =

Gregory's may refer to:

- Gregory's (food company)
- Gregory's Street Directory
