= Denso mapcode =

System for georeferencing in Japan developed by Denso

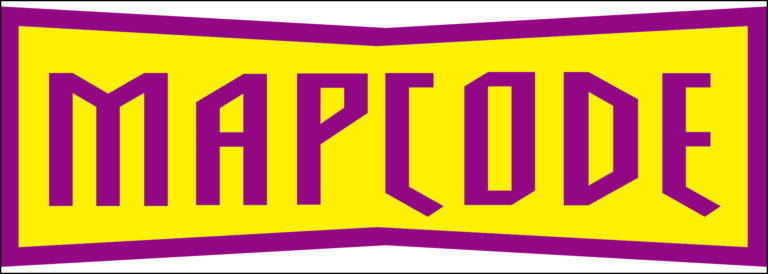
Denso Mapcode full logo

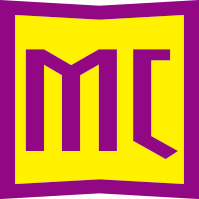
Denso Mapcode small logo

The Denso MapCode system is a spatial reference system (not to be confused with the international mapcode system, a different spatial reference system). Denso MapCodes are 7- to 10-digit codes identifying specific 900-square-meter areas in Japan.

== History ==
The Denso MapCode system was developed in 1997 by Denso Corporation for easy identification of any location in Japan by Japanese navigation systems. Car navigation systems are unable to identify locations for which addresses or telephone numbers are not available or house numbers, like in Japan, are not sequential. The Denso MapCode system enables accurate pinpointing by number, predetermined according to latitude and longitude.

The use of MapCodes is free to end users but corporations wanting to commercialise it will need to sign a contract with Denso and pay a fee. In Japan, car navigation system suppliers such as Denso itself, Clarion, Kenwood, Fujitsu Ten, Sony, Panasonic, Pioneer and Alpine Electronics have adopted the system and Toyota, Honda, Nissan, Fuji Heavy Industries, BMW Japan, General Motors Japan, Jaguar Japan and Land Rover Japan have introduced it in their vehicles.

== Design principles ==
The Denso MapCode system divided Japan into 1162 zones, each zone into 900 blocks, and each block into 900 areas. A Denso MapCode number consists of the zone number (up to 4 digits), the block number (always 3 digits) and the area number (always 3 digits), a numeric code of up to 10 digits.

As the MapCode numbers proved too coarse for certain situations (this first version identified an area with a radius of about 100 meters), the system was extended in 2004: by adding an asterisk and two extra digits, a specific cell of 9 square meters can be identified within an area. The design of the division in blocks is graphically explained on the website of Denso.

== Application ==
Neither Garmin nor TomTom publish their own car navigation maps for Japan, although a third-party map for Garmin is available from UUD. Nowadays Japanese car rental companies offer on request at the time of reservation a rental car with a multi-language car navigation system. Navigation is not usually done by entering the destination street address, but by entering the telephone number or the Denso MapCode of the destination address.

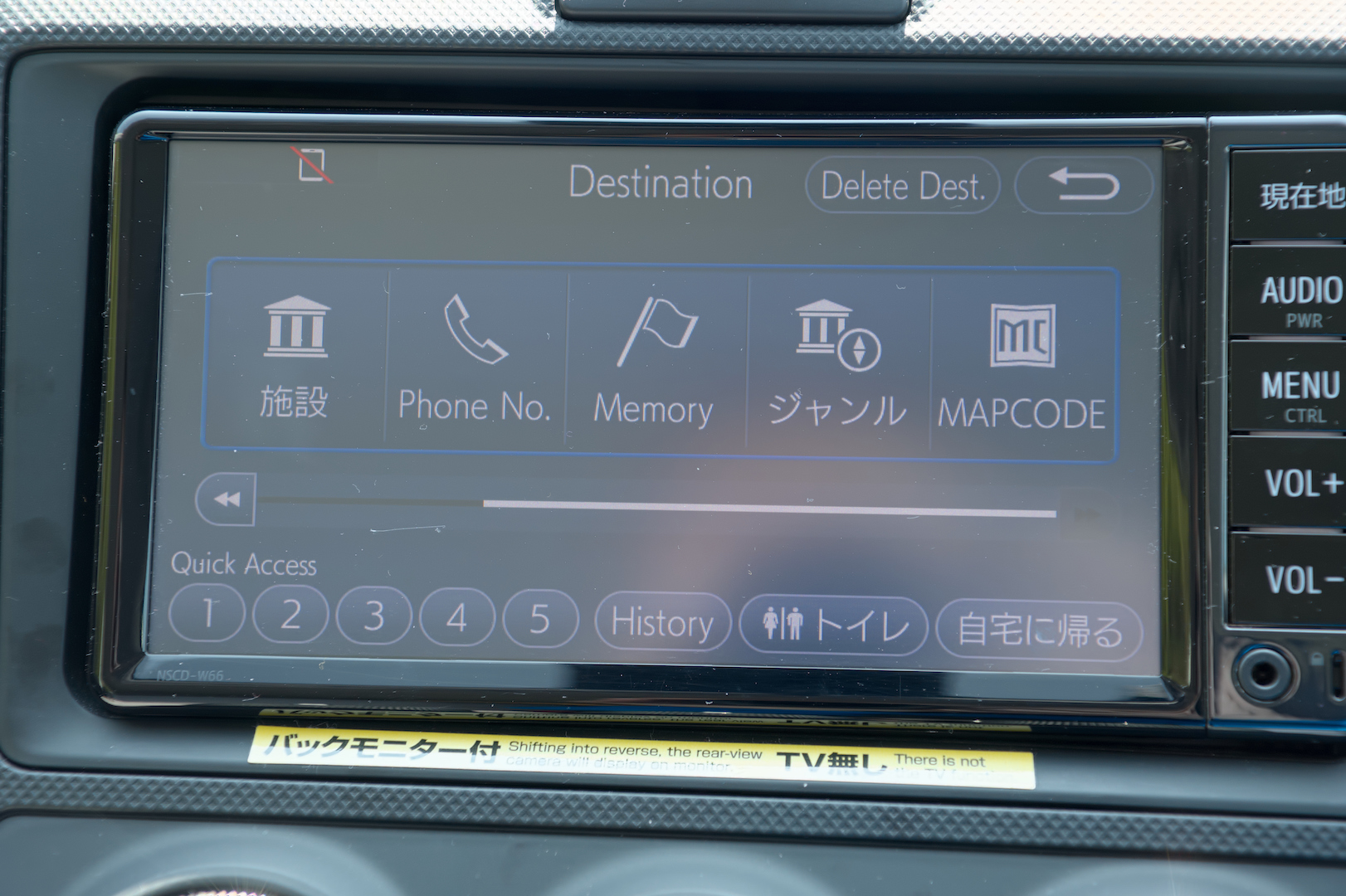
Car navigation menu with MapCode option

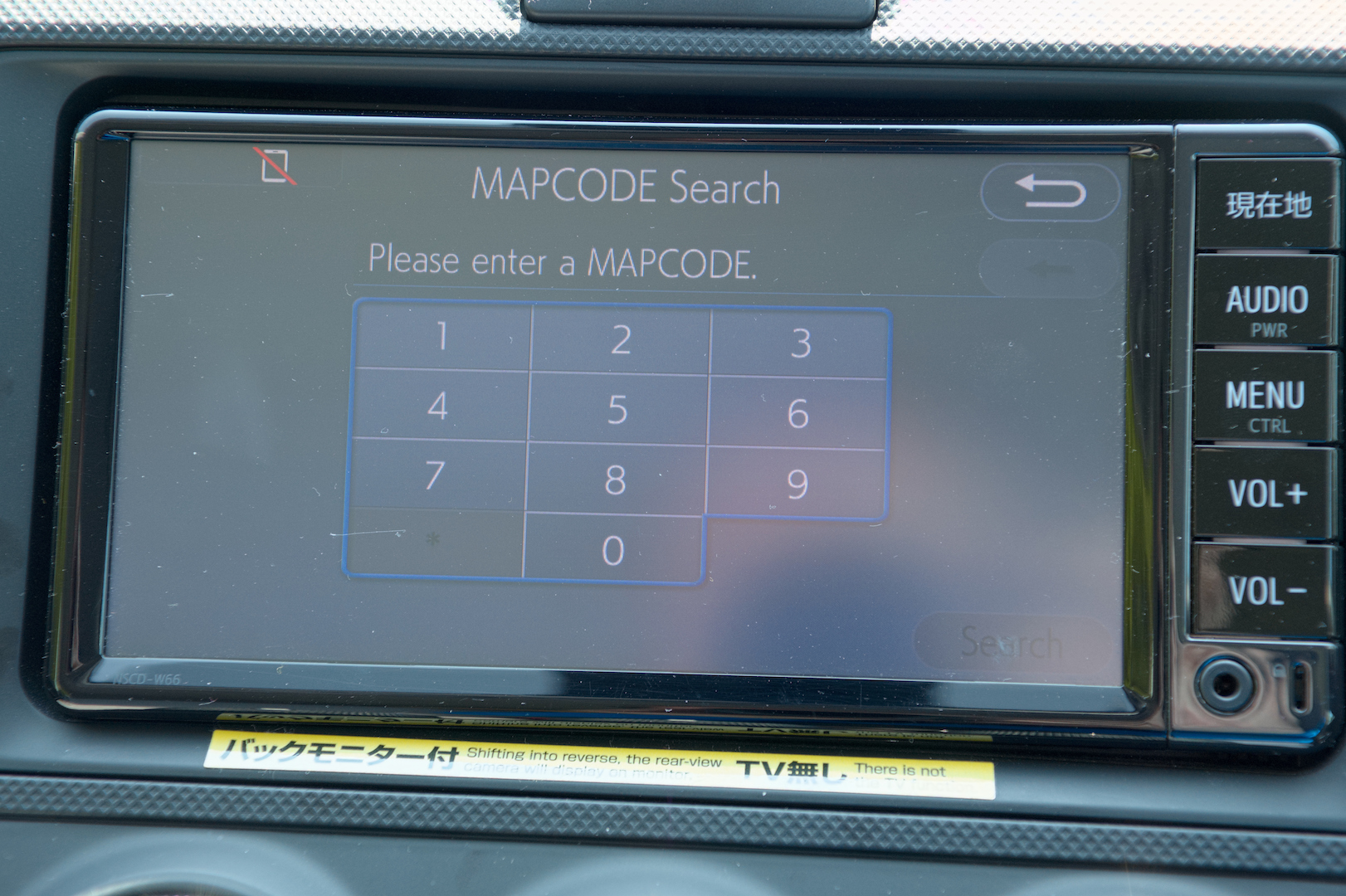
Car navigation menu with MapCode keypad

Before August 2016, finding a Denso MapCode of a Japanese address involved 6 steps on the website http://mapion.co.jp in the Japanese language. Luckily, new alternatives such as http://japanmapcode.com/en or https://mapcodejapan.com uses Google maps and displays the mapcode for any address or GPS-coordinate entered. You can even point at a location on the map and the website displays the address and mapcode.

On October 18, 2016, Denso launched the free smartphone app Drive! Nippon, for iOS and Android. This app, bilingual in Japanese and English, will show the MapCode if you know the street address of GPS-coordinate. If you point at a location on the map, it will show the street address and GPS-coordinate and produces the MapCode. Internet connection is required.
