= Togyaunggale =

Town in Myanmar

Coordinates: 16°52′00″N 96°13′00″E

Togyaunggale also spelled and pronounced as Toe Gyaung Kalay is a town in southern Myanmar under Yangon State within North/East Dagon Township. In fact the region is commanded by North Dagon or East Dagon Township and there also has a railway station located in Toe Gyaung Kalay that can reach to National railway lines outside Yangon City. It also can reach to Pego City in Pego State.

Toe Gyaung Kalay is placing in border between North and South or East and South Dagon Townships.

The rail line is also connected with Yangon City Circle Rail route, not just from City Central Station.

There also closed to a Pagoda, monastery, National Swimming pool for Myanmar sport selections and Bus Gates.

Southern to South Dagon Township.

== Transport ==
It is served by a station on the Myanmar Railways Network.

== See also ==
- Transport in Myanmar
