= Universal Publishers =

Universal Publishers may refer to:

- Universal Publishers (Australia)
- Universal Publishers (United States)
