= Ausway =

Australian cartography and publishing company

Ausway Publishing Pty Ltd
- Type: Private
- Industry: Publishing
- Founded: 1966
- Founder: Merv Godfrey, Iven Mackay
- Headquarters: Mount Waverley, Victoria, Australia
- Products: Maps
- Services: Cartography
- Website: ausway.com

Ausway is an Australian cartography and publishing company that produces comprehensive street directories and maps. In addition to its directories, Ausway also produces laminated, folded and rolled maps of varying sizes and formats, 200dpi digital map images, and index data. Ausway markets a satellite navigation unit loaded with their mapping data, branded as Navway.

== History ==
Seeking a higher quality street directory for Melbourne, Merv Godfrey and Iven Mackay began drawing maps by hand for their proposed directory in 1961.

Having produced road maps for petrol stations in the 1960s in his spare time, Godfrey took 12 months leave from his employer, the Government of Victoria's State Electricity Commission, to work on the directory. Godfrey resigned from his job, and worked with his wife to complete the publication. In a second-hand Morris Minor car, Mackay took the drawn maps and drove around checking each road and detail to confirm them.

After five years of meticulous research and pen-and-ink drawing, their maps were ready for publication. The first edition of Melway was released in May 1966 with a $2.50 price tag. Being twice as expensive as its nearest rival, critics dismissed it as too expensive, however the directory's higher quality prevailed and it sold well, especially after receiving publicity from Graham Kennedy on the popular In Melbourne Tonight television variety show's "New Products" segment. The directory was embraced by local residents – the word "Melways" quickly became a household name for "street directory".

With continuing success, the company grew from Godfrey's private residence in Malvern, to an office location in Mount Waverley in 1985.

In 1991, Melway Holdings changed its name to Ausway Publishing, and expanded into Sydney in 1993 with the launch of the Sydway directory, into Brisbane in 2005 with the Brisway, and into Perth in 2010 with the Melway Perth.

== Products ==
=== Street Directories ===
Current directories produced by Ausway are:

- Melway – Greater Melbourne 49th edition for 2023
  - Melway Large Print Edition – a larger, A3-sized version of the current edition
  - Melway Ballarat Edition 1 - a separate directory to the Melway, containing 19 maps of Ballarat and surrounding areas
- Sydway – Sydney & Blue Mountains 18th edition for 2016
- Brisway – Brisbane, Gold Coast & Sunshine Coast plus Toowoomba (5th edition, released April 2010)
- Melway Perth - Perth plus Albany, Bunbury, Geraldton and Kalgoorlie (released December 2009). This street directory is derived from the Perth StreetSmart street directory

A separate directory covering the Central Coast, New South Wales, was integrated in the Sydway directory since its 13th edition.

=== eway ===
The eway is an electronic copy of the Melway, Brisway, Sydway and Melway Perth street directories. It includes the ability to print out maps, calculate distances and quickly search for locations. It is only available for Microsoft Windows, and is currently being updated in sync with the printed books.

=== GPS ===
Ausway also market a GPS in-car navigator known as Navway. It includes Navteq mapping and routing data (as an alternative to the UBD-derived data in Sensis WhereIs mapping data). There are currently three models of Navway:

- M470 (Navway Map) - the 'base model' with Ausway-style roads, lane guidance and a Bluetooth hands-free mobile phone connection
- T470 (Navway with Traffic) - similar to the M470 but with access to the TCM SUNA traffic channel for live updates on congested and slow-moving areas
- P470 (Navway Professional) - the 'high-end model'

=== Ausway Android and iPhone apps ===
An Ausway app for Android and iPhone called Aus Map has been released. This app requires an internet connection since it downloads the map data as needed from www.street-directory.com.au. Melway, Sydway, Brisway and Melway Perth are all included along with other map scales from street-directory.com. Aus Map includes the ability to act as a GPS with onscreen direction instructions. At present (2013) the direction instructions are limited to onscreen only. No voice audio support.

== Online mapping ==
Ausway's directory products are searchable online through Melbourne based Virtual Map Australia's street-directory.com.au site. The advertisement-supported site is in competition to Whereis, a site by Sensis, the advertising and directories arm of Telstra Corporation. Sensis owns Universal Publishers' UBD directories, rivals to Ausway's publications, and use that mapping data in their Whereis site.
