= Melway =

Australian street directory

- The front cover of the Melway 36th (2009) edition.
- Language: English
- Genre: Street directory
- Publisher: Ausway
- Publication date: May 1966 –
- Publication place: Australia
- Media type: Paperback
- ISBN: 978-0-909439-75-0
- Website: www.melway.com.au

Melway, colloquially referred to as Melways or The Melways, is a street directory for Melbourne, Victoria, Australia and its immediate surrounds, including the city of Geelong. Formerly a highly ubiquitous directory, Melway is currently in its 50th edition, the 2024 edition.

== History ==
Melway was conceived by Merv Godfrey and Ray Harrison in the 1950s. After Harrison died in 1961, Iven Mackay was recruited by Merv as the new partner for the project. Godfrey and Mackay developed the first edition of Melway, which was released in May 1966. Melway initially faced skepticism toward its market potential due to its selling price of $2.50, nearly twice that of its nearest competitor. All of the 106 original maps were hand-drawn in ink. First editions of Melway can sell for around $500 on the second-hand market. A reprint of the first edition was released in 2012, and can be purchased from Melway. The original maps from the first edition can be viewed online via a clickable map.

By the early 1980s, Melway was the most popular street directory in Melbourne, holding over 80 per cent of the market, and "Melway" had begun to be used as a generic term for any street directory.

In 1982, after the fourteenth edition of Melway had been released, it was awarded the International Cartographic Association Excellence Award, as well as the inaugural award for Cartographic Excellence from the Australian Institute of Cartographers. Ausway won the Australian award again in 1994 for its first edition of Sydway.

As of 2001, most motorists in Melbourne had a copy of Melway, as did many taxi drivers, bus drivers, and hire cars. The Victoria Police, fire brigade, ambulance service, Victorian State Emergency Service, St John Ambulance Victoria and for the State government car fleet officially use Melway. Its main competitor is UBD-Gregory's, which is the most popular brand in all other states and territories.

== Features ==
While primarily a street directory, Melway editions also contain details on public transport (train, tram, and bus routes, tickets and prices), bicycle paths, suburb and postcode details, public parks and reserves, landmarks (such as commercial buildings, telephone boxes, pubs and restaurants), attractions, and also boat mooring details in recognised docks.

In addition to the blue-bordered and red-bordered street maps, there are yellow-bordered maps of university campuses and crematoria. Moreover, there are also green-bordered maps showing routes through the country to Adelaide and Sydney. Many versions of the street directory are obtainable, usually in standard or large-print editions, wall-charts, or an online catalogue.

=== Grid references ===
In Melbourne it is common for a Melway reference (in the format Map—Grid reference, e.g., 59 K5) to be given along with directions on, for example, an event notice or real estate advertisement. It is generally assumed that everyone has, or has access to, a copy of the directory in Melbourne. By comparison, the UBD reference for a particular "Melways reference" (as it is colloquially known) can be significantly different, but is rarely (if ever) provided. It is generally assumed that all such references, regardless of whether it is explicitly stated or not, are from the Melway directory and not from the UBD. The reverse is true in all other states and territories.

Some organisations provide a Melway year of publication in addition to their map reference (e.g., (2006) 70 F6), to avoid confusion if map references change in newer versions of the directory. However, Melway has kept the need for this to an absolute minimum over the years. It has held off several cartographic features, including a more logical overall tiling of pages across the entire metropolitan area (which do appear in the Sydway and Brisway). That is to protect the integrity and continuity of the original 1966 grid references.

=== Cartography ===
One of the distinguishing differences of a Melway-style map from other Australian street directories is in the rendering of roads. Rather than the traditional drawing of two lines with the road name printed in-between, (known as "double casing") Melway maps show a single line with the name above or below the road, in many colours reflecting the identity or usage of the road. This allows for much more detail to fit into the same size map, as well as showing dual carriageways, slip lanes, service roads, speed bumps, roundabouts, and other useful information.

UBD has copied this difference in their Melbourne directory, in a bid to capitalise on the familiarity of Melway. UBD has only attempted this in the Melbourne directory, retaining their usual format for their other directories. The map design was first fully completed by computers in 2000.

== Editions ==
There have been 50 editions of Melway since the mid-1960s. A new edition is typically released late one year and denoted as being for the following year. For example, edition 35 was released in August 2007 and denoted as the 2008 Melway. Despite this discrepancy, numerous roads and other features under construction or proposal are included (e.g.Eastlink in the 35th edition). Therefore, editions dating up to 5 or even ten years old could still remain useful.

=== List of editions ===
Edition	Year	Additions and changes	Notes
1	1966	All maps from this edition, as well as editions 2–5, can be viewed online for free via a clickable map.	
2	1968	Central Melbourne map introduced.	
3	1969	Postcode boundaries, house numbers and 10 new maps	
4	1970	11 new maps	
5	1971	Over-dimensional route maps	
6	1973	Enlarged university maps	
7	1974	45 new maps including Mornington Peninsula, 4,000 new streets	
8	1975	750 new streets	
9	1976	Traffic lights, 20 new maps	
10	1977	36 new maps including Bacchus Marsh and Geelong, as well as kindergartens and RSL clubs	
11	1978	4m clearance bridges, taxi and car hire	
12	1979	Rescaled to metric	
13	1980	Public transport section and bus routes	
14	1982	Inner city maps, bicycle paths, Bellarine Peninsula maps	
15	1984	Inner Geelong maps, enlarged map of Victorian Arts Centre	
16	1986	9 new maps including Warburton	
17	1987	Revised and updated	
18	1988	Large print edition first published	
19	1989	28 new maps, Yarra Glen and Phillip Island	
20	1990	Central Melbourne mobility map	
21	1991	Bus routes reintroduced, 30 new maps including 18 touring maps, Australia map	
22	1993	36 new maps. Enlarged maps for Dandenong, Frankston, and Melbourne Airport	
23	1994	24 new maps including Sunbury, Craigieburn and Healesville, cross referencing, new council boundaries	
24	1996	Enlarged CBD maps, 9 new maps, fire, water and electricity boundaries, CityLink	
25	1997	Enlarged Southbank, Kensington and Footscray maps	
26	1998	24 new maps including Greater Geelong, Doreen, Mernda, and Docklands boundaries	
27	1999	Enlarged maps of St Kilda, new suburb boundaries	For 2000
28	2000	Every map computer generated, hook turns, official suburb names, boundaries and postcodes	For 2001
29	2001	29 new maps, expanded coverage of Werribee, dog prohibited areas	For 2002
30	2002	17 new maps including Lorne, Nar Nar Goon and Tynong, Queenscliffe enlargement, bicycle facilities	For 2003
31	2003	GPS compatible, enlarged maps of Box Hill and Moonee Ponds, marine parks, shared bicycle road routes	For 2004
32	2004	12 new maps including Wollert and Eynesbury, Eastern Ring Road route, Avalon Airport facilities	For 2005
33	2005	New hierarchy of roads, Craigieburn Bypass	For 2006
34	2006	Flemington Racecourse enlargement	For 2007
35	2007	eWay electronic street directory released	For 2008
36	2008	Petrol stations, speed and red light cameras, EastLink fully detailed	For 2009. Included Melway Ballarat edition 1.
37	2009	New maps for Beveridge, proposed Peninsula Link alignment	For 2010
38	2010	Peninsula Link alignment under construction, proposed Outer Ring Road and rail corridor	For 2011
39	2011	New maps for Macedon, Mount Macedon, Riddells Creek and Bannockburn	For 2012
40	2012	Completed link between Geelong Ring Road and Princes Highway, proposed link between Surf Coast Highway and Anglesea Road, new Geelong suburbs of Armstrong Creek and Charlemont	For 2013
41	2013	Includes Kilmore, proposed link between the Surf Coast Highway and Angelsea Road, and completed Peninsula Link	For 2014
42	2014	Includes Koo Wee Rup	For 2015
43	2015	Includes 900 more streets and the proposed West Gate Distributor	For 2016
44	2016	1100 additional street listings and 500 updated maps	For 2017
45	2017	Includes 2600 additional streets, 500 revised maps, updates on the West Gate Tunnel and the Metro Tunnel channel	For 2018
46	2018	1000 more street listings	For 2019
47	2019	500 revised maps totalling 2000 further street listings, updates on the Level Crossing Removal Project, Metro Tunnel, North East Link and Drysdale Bypass	For 2020
48	2020	1700 additional street listings and expanded coverage of Cardinia, Pakenham South, Wallan, Tynong and Pakenham	For 2021
49	2022	1350 additional street listings and expanded coverage of Melbourne to Geelong, Healesville, Kinglake, Wallan, Wandong, Gisborne, Bacchus Marsh, Pakenham and Portsea	For 2023
50	2023	2100 new street listings, further expanded coverage of Melbourne to Geelong, Healesville, Kinglake, Wallan, Wandong, Gisborne, Bacchus Marsh, Pakenham and Portsea, Mickleham extension, proposed government projects such as the Railway Crossing Removal Program, the under construction Pakenham to Koo Wee Rup Bypass, Metro Rail Tunnel, West Gate Tunnel, and the North East Link which will link the Metropolitan Ring Road in Greensborough to the Eastern Freeway in Bulleen. Also includes the proposed Frankston to Box Hill alignment of the underground outer suburban rail loop	For 2024

== Expansion into other Australian markets ==
Melway has spawned an umbrella company known as Ausway, which started producing directories for other cities and towns from the early 1990s onwards. These other directories include:

- Sydway – Sydney, introduced 1994
- Sydway: Central Coast – Central Coast, New South Wales region, introduced 1999
- Brisway – Brisbane, Queensland introduced 2005 and most recent issue was 2017
- Ballarat Special Edition Melway – introduced 2008
- Melway Perth – Perth, Western Australia, introduced 2010
