= Transport in Myanmar =

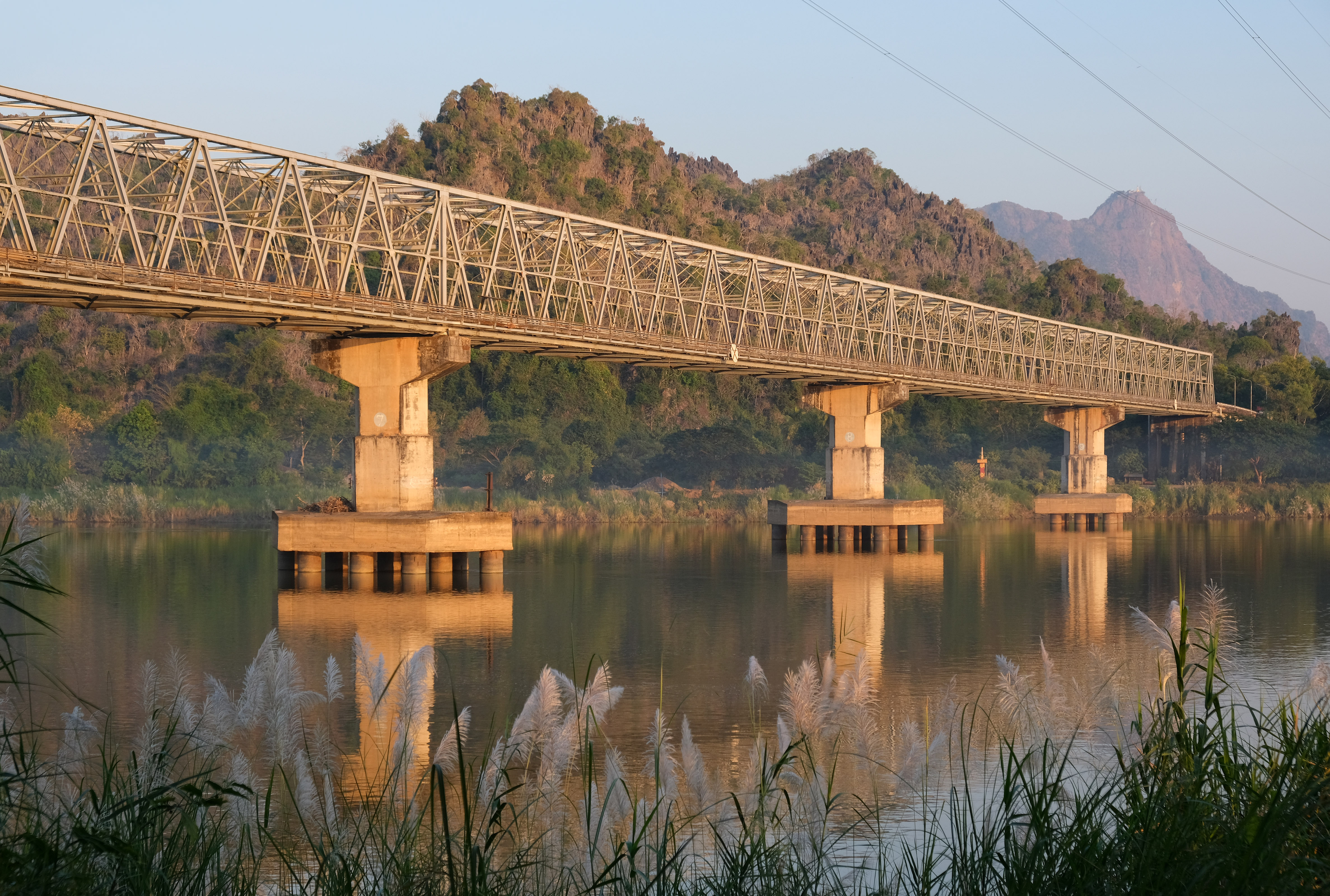
Thanlwin Bridge in Hpa An

Transport in Myanmar is characterised by a strong reliance on road transport for both passenger and freight movement. Other modes such as railways, inland waterways, and air transport play secondary roles.

== Road ==
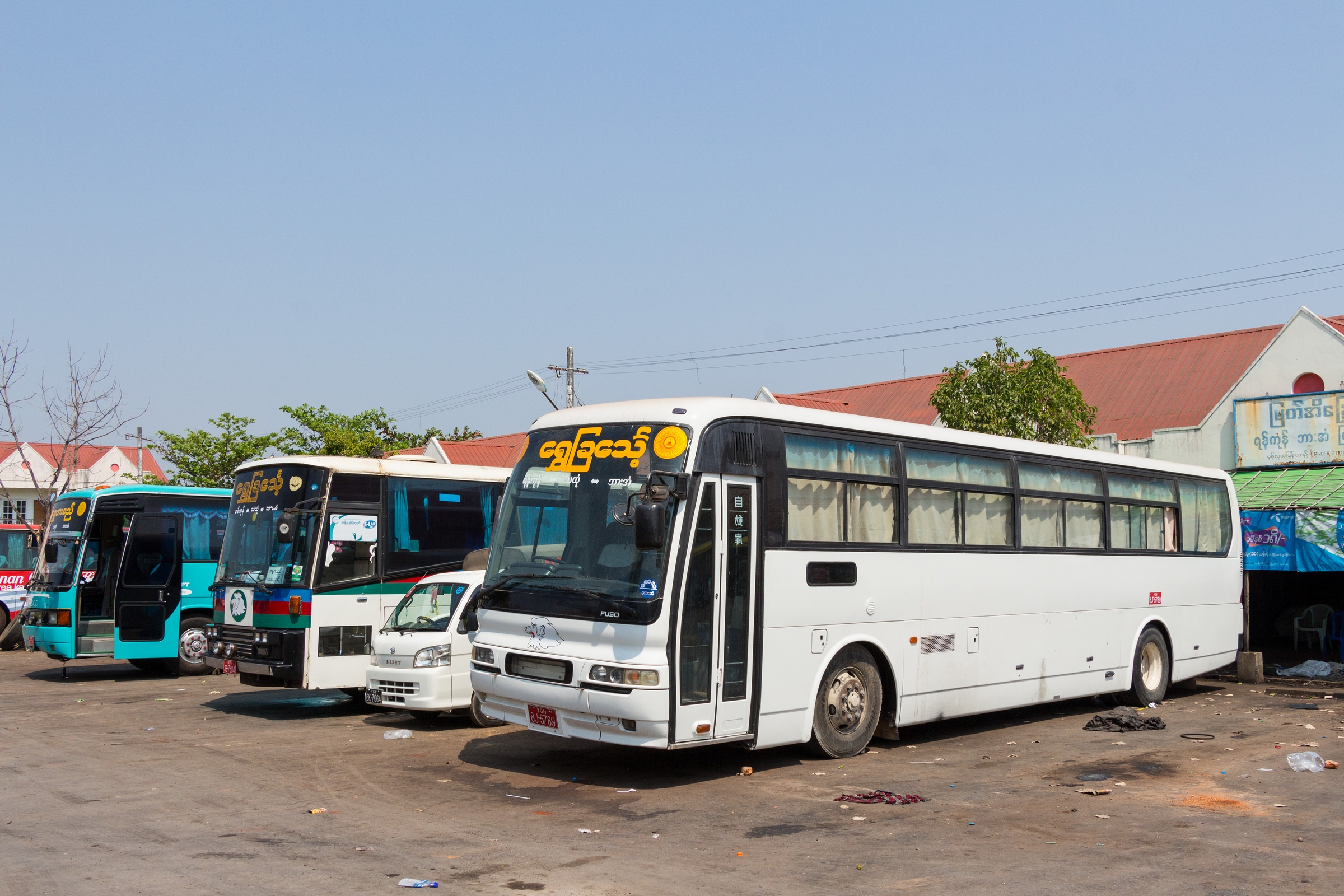
Express buses parked at Hpa-an bus station

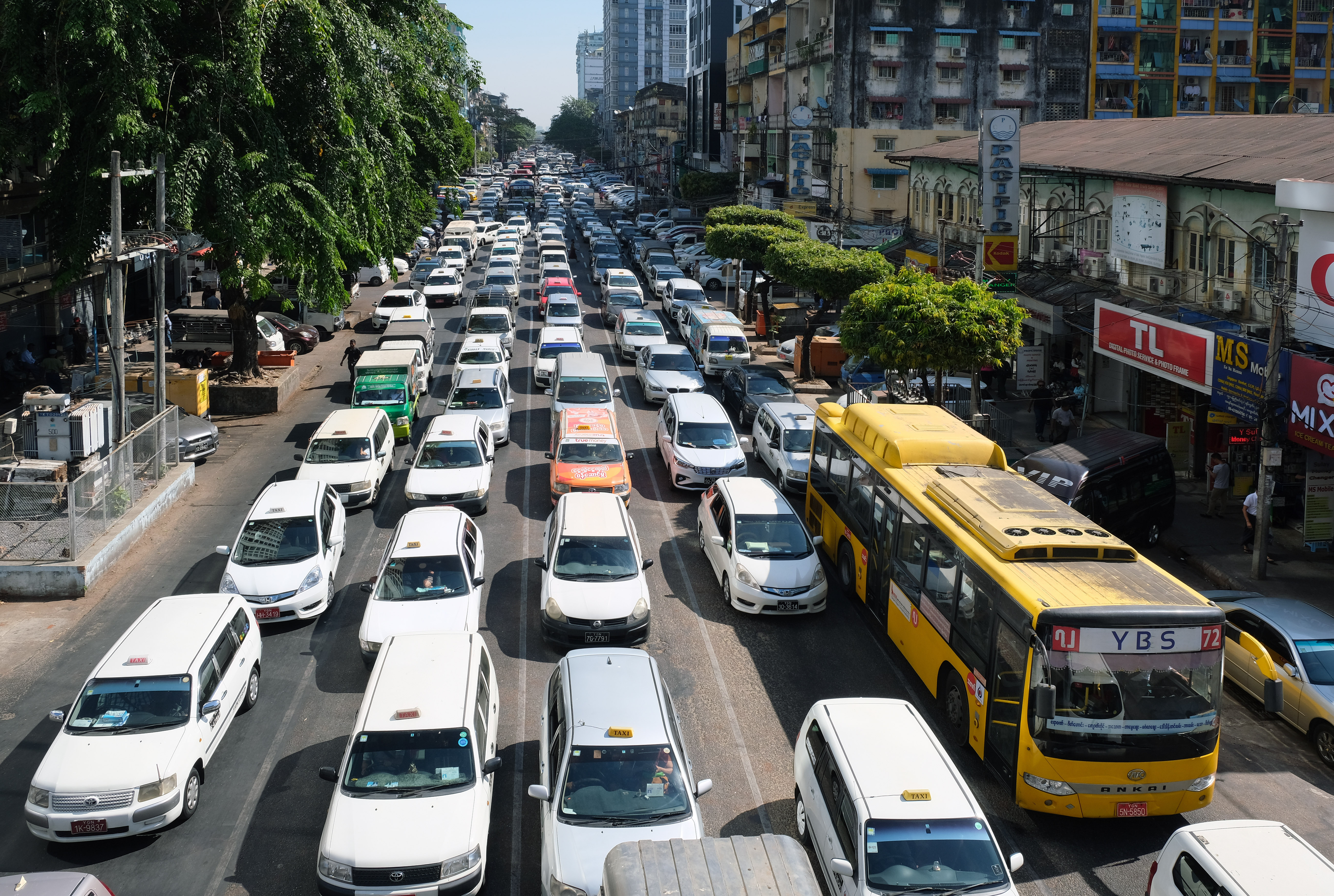
Traffic on Anawrahta Road, Yangon

In long-distance passenger transport, defined as trips greater than 100 kilometres, buses and coaches are the most widely used mode. Buses accounted for the majority of long-distance passenger trips, representing well over half of total passenger movements and nearly two-thirds of passenger-kilometers travelled. Private cars formed the second largest share, carrying about one-quarter of all long-distance passengers. Freight transport is also more concentrated in road-based modes, trucks carried close to ninety per cent of the total freight tonnage and an almost identical share of freight ton-kilometers.

The condition of Myanmar's roads is generally poor. According to statistics from the Ministry of Construction in 2015, among expressways, national highways, regional and state roads, and highways in border regions, only about 20% are paved with asphalt or concrete. The remainder consists of gravel or unpaved roads, or even simple trails.

The construction of Myanmar's highways relies heavily on the Build-Operate-Transfer (BOT) model. Statistics show that 4,752 kilometres of roads nationwide have adopted the BOT model, including key routes such as the Yangon-Meiktila-Mandalay Highway and the Mandalay–Muse Highway.

=== Urban ===
Yangon's urban transport was relied on a largely bus system, supported by a radial road network, narrow secondary streets, and a small, outdated 50 km railway serving only 1% of trips. Buses, regulated by nonprofit committees and operated alongside two major companies, efficiently provided low-cost transport without subsidies. However, vehicle numbers doubled from 160,000 in 2011 to 320,000 in 2015, and motorcycles are banned in Yangon, spreading congestion beyond peak hours and reducing average speeds from 30 km/h to 10–15 km/h.

Mandalay has transitioned from a city of bicycles to one dominated by motorcycles, which now account for approximately 70% of trips, while buses serve less than 3% and operate with low efficiency. The city's dense grid and wide roads remain largely uncongested, except in the small central area where mixed use of motorcycles, public transport, and delivery vehicles creates localised congestion and operational stress. Motorcycles provide cost-effective, flexible mobility for individuals but exacerbate air and noise pollution, increase accidents, and threaten long-term urban sustainability.

== Rail ==
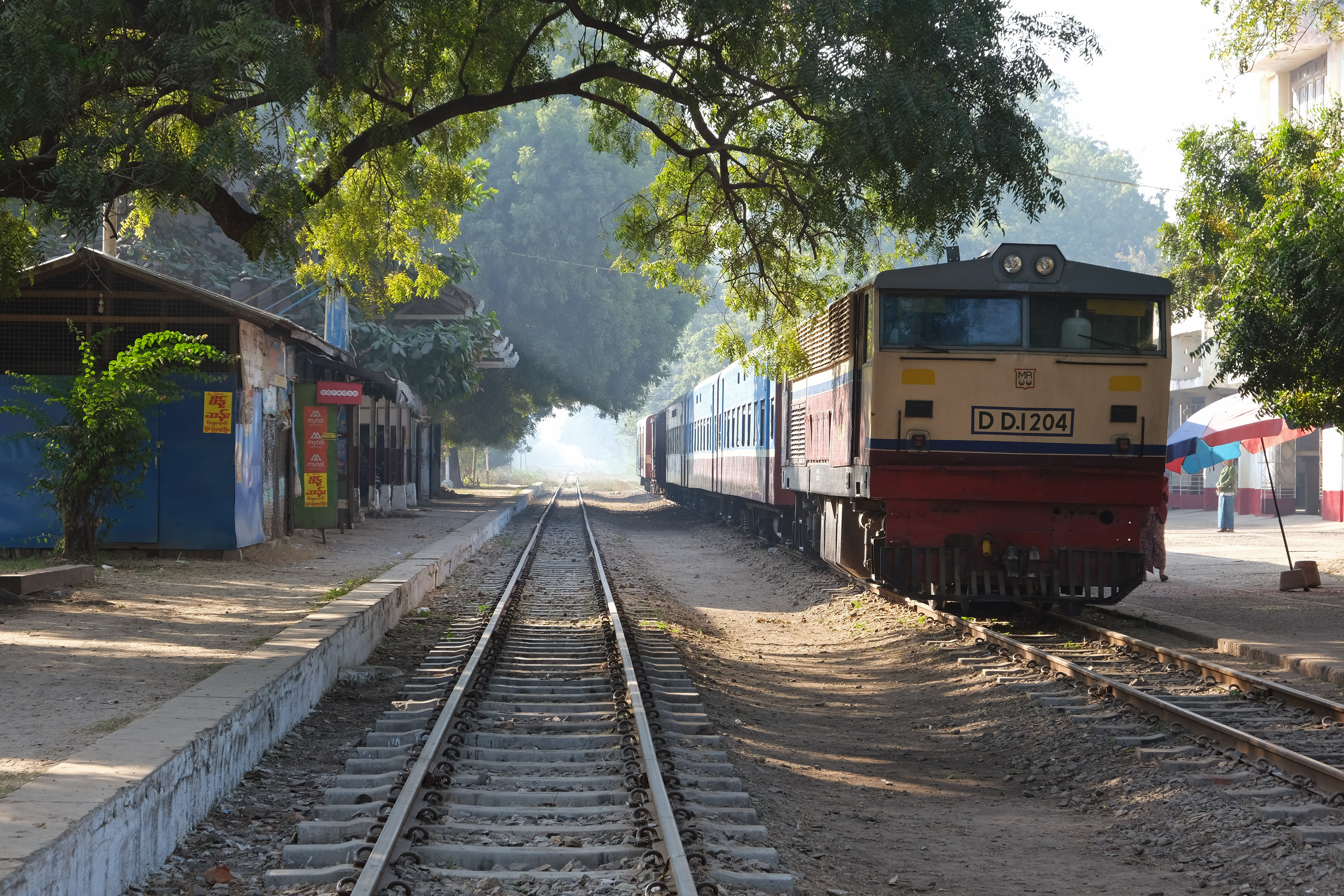
The trains are relatively slow in Myanmar. The railway trip from Bagan to Mandalay takes about 7.5 hours (111 miles; 179 km)

As of 2014, Myanmar had 6,106 km (3,794 mi) of railways in train routes, all 1,000 mm (3 ft 3 3/8 in) gauge, and there are currently no rail links to adjacent countries. Much of Myanma Railways' rolling stock is obsolete, with a large share of locomotives, wagons, and coaches over 30-40 years old, leading to frequent breakdowns, low availability, high fuel consumption, and difficulty sourcing spare parts, leaving many units unsuitable for rehabilitation.

Despite its extensive network, MR carries only about one in ten passengers and around 5-6% of freight, mainly due to poor service quality: most passenger trips are short and uncompetitive with buses or private cars, trains are slow, crowded, uncomfortable, and frequently delayed. Freight services suffer from a lack of traction power, diversion of locomotives to passenger use, and the absence of container train operations, though steps are now being taken to establish a Yangon–Mandalay container service.

== Water ==
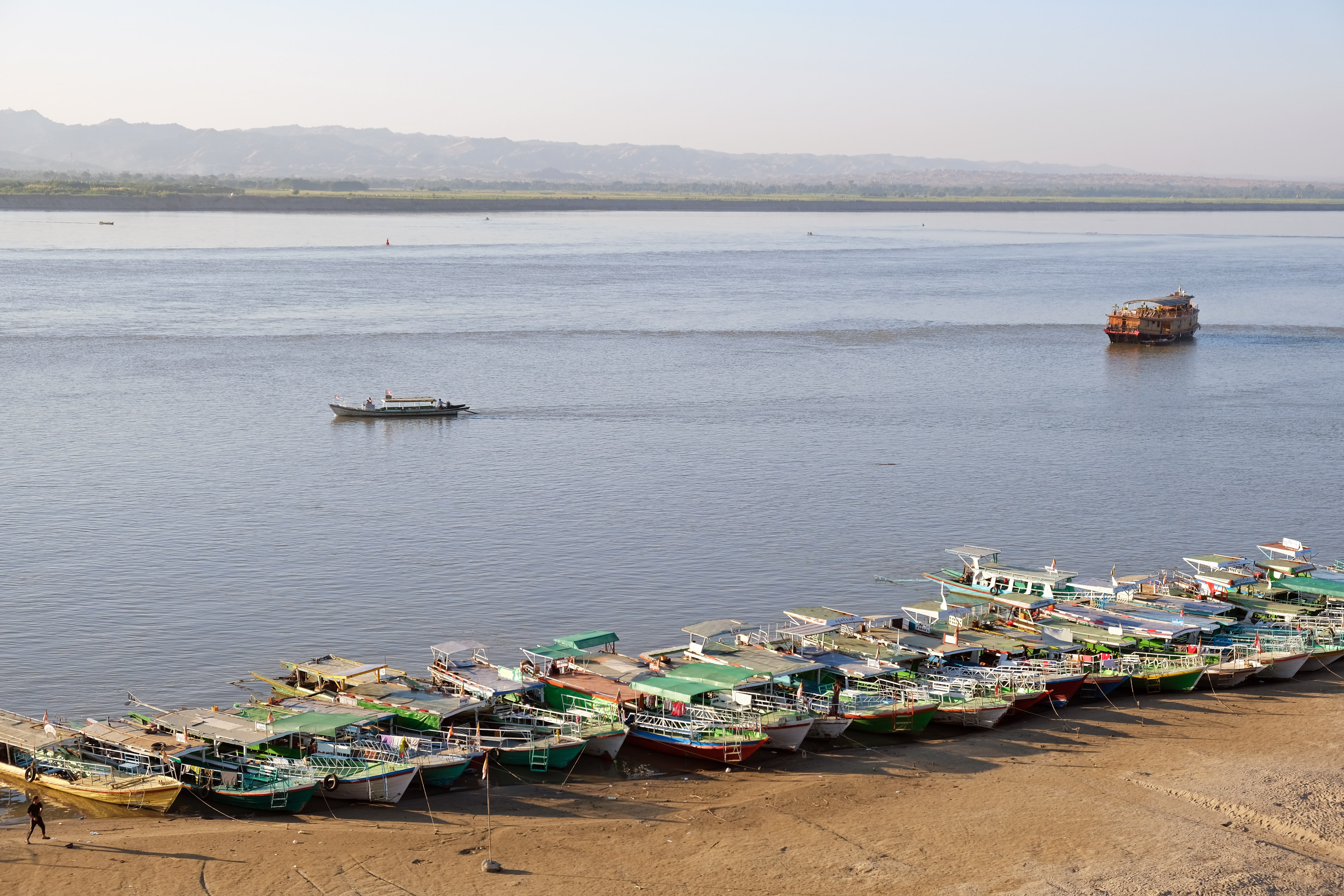
Ayeyarwady River ferries in Bagan

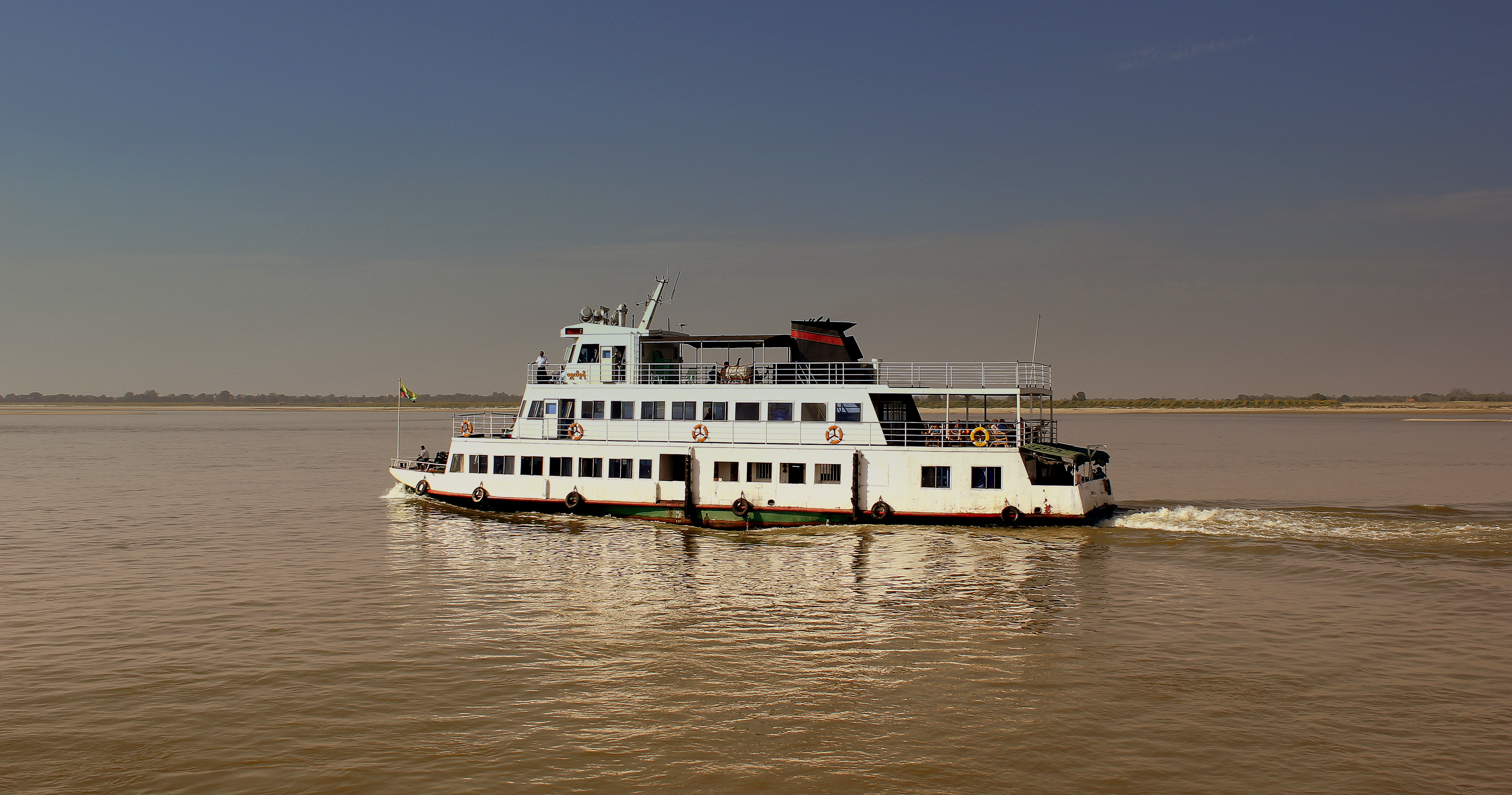
Ferries in Myanmar

Myanmar's inland water transport once central to Myanmar's transport system, now has experienced a significant decline in recent decades. As of 2015, it accounted for only 6% of long-distance freight and 1.5% of passenger transport, a sharp contrast to its historical prominence. The sector's challenges include outdated infrastructure, limited navigability, and competition from road transport. Despite these issues, the Irrawaddy River remains a viable option for transporting low-value freight between Yangon and Mandalay, with potential cost reductions achievable through improvements in navigation channels and terminals.

=== Merchant marine ===
Total: 24 ships (with a volume of 1,000 gross tonnage (GT) or over) totalling 472,284 GT/716,533 tonnes deadweight (DWT)
Ships by type: bulk carrier 1, cargo ship 17, passenger ship 2, passenger/cargo 3, specialised tanker 1 (2008)
note: a flag of convenience registry; includes ships of 3 countries: Cyprus 1, Germany 1, Japan 1

=== Ports and harbours ===
Sea

- Yangon
- Sittwe (Akyab)
- Dawei – railhead – new deepwater port under construction 2005

River

- Myitkyina
- Bhamo
- Mandalay
- Pakokku
- Pathein

== Air ==
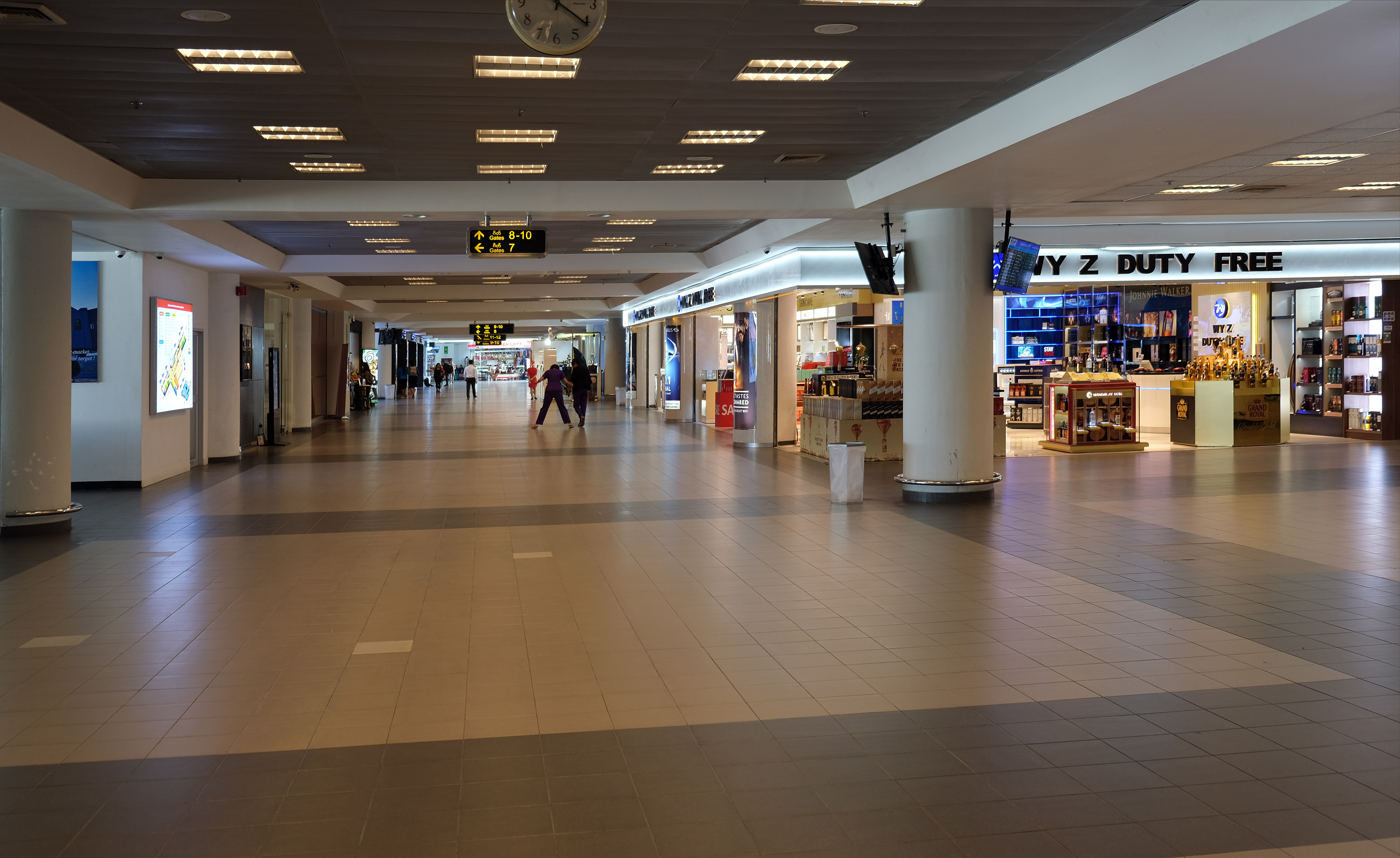
Mandalay International Airport

Civil aviation contributed a very small share, approximately two to three per cent, but remained significant for specific groups of travellers, particularly business passengers and international tourists.

=== Airports ===
Due to the long-term civil war, many airports in Myanmar have been closed due to unstable situation, or converted into military airports due to military needs. Most of the remaining airports are also small in scale, only Yangon International, Mandalay International and Naypyidaw International had adequate facilities to handle larger jets.

=== Airlines ===
Myanmar's aviation sector is relatively small and still developing, with a mix of state-owned and private airlines. The national carrier, Myanmar National Airlines, operates both domestic and limited international routes, competing the largest private airlines Myanmar Airways International, which mainly focus on connecting major cities and tourist destinations within the country, with a few regional flights abroad.

Most carriers operate small fleets, often with ageing aircraft, and the industry faces challenges related to safety standards, infrastructure, and financial sustainability. Political instability in recent years have further constrained growth, though tourism remains a key driver for the sector's gradual recovery.

== Pipelines ==
- Crude oil 2,228 km (1,384 mi); natural gas 558 km (347 mi).
- Proposed pipe from Kyaukphyu through Mandalay to Kunming

== Regulation ==
The government of Myanmar has several ministries controlling transportation, including the Ministry of Construction, the Ministry of Border Affairs, the Ministry of Transport, the Ministry of Rail Transport, etc.

Myanmar's road network is generally managed by several government bodies, primarily Ministry of Construction and Ministry of Border Affairs, with Ministry of Transport responsible for road transport operations.

According to the Roads Law of Myanmar, the Ministry of Construction oversees most matters concerning national highways, which plays the most important role in the country's road administration. Local road departments carry out tasks assigned by the Ministry of Construction and manage road affairs within their respective regions. The Ministry of Border Affairs coordinates road affairs in areas controlled by ethnic armed groups, such as Wa State. Additionally, City Development Committees are responsible for road construction and management within urban areas.

== See also ==
- Myanmar Railways
- Road Transport Authority (Myanmar)
