= Melway Perth =

Western Australia road map

- Original title: StreetSmart; Metropolitan Street Directory; Road Maps with Index
- Language: English
- Publisher: Ausway
- Publication date: 1944 - 2013
- Publication place: Australia
- Website: www.melway.com.au

Melway Perth was a street directory for the city of Perth, Western Australia. It was published by Ausway, using indexing and mapping data from Landgate. It competed with the UBD and Gregory's Perth street directories.

== History ==
Perth's first street directory, Road Maps with Index was published in 1944 by the Department of Lands & Surveys. In 1968, the directory underwent a format change and was rebranded as the Metropolitan Street Directory. The directory was then renamed StreetSmart in 1990. In 1996, the street directory became the first in Western Australia to be digitally produced. In 2009 the directory was acquired by Ausway and published as Melway Greater Perth from the 2010 edition.

== Maps ==
The Melway Greater Perth included a variety of different maps. In addition to coverage of the Perth metropolitan area, the Melway Perth included the following maps:

- Arterial roads
- Perth approaches
- Enlargements of Perth, Fremantle and Mandurah CBDs
- Rottnest Island, with enlargements of major settlement areas
- Enlargements of various universities and hospitals
- Perth Zoo
- Perth railway station
- Perth bicycle network
- Public transport
- Airport maps for Perth and Jandakot airports
- Maps of Albany, Bunbury/Australind, Geraldton and Kalgoorlie–Boulder
