= Traffic message channel =

Technology for delivering traffic and travel information to motor vehicle drivers

Traffic Message Channel (TMC) is a technology for delivering traffic and travel information to motor vehicle drivers. It is digitally coded using the ALERT C or TPEG protocol into Radio Data System (RDS) carried via conventional FM radio broadcasts. It can also be transmitted on Digital Audio Broadcasting or satellite radio. TMC allows silent delivery of dynamic information suitable for reproduction or display in the user's language without interrupting audio broadcast services. Both public and commercial services are operational in many countries. When data is integrated directly into a navigation system, traffic information can be used in the system's route calculation.

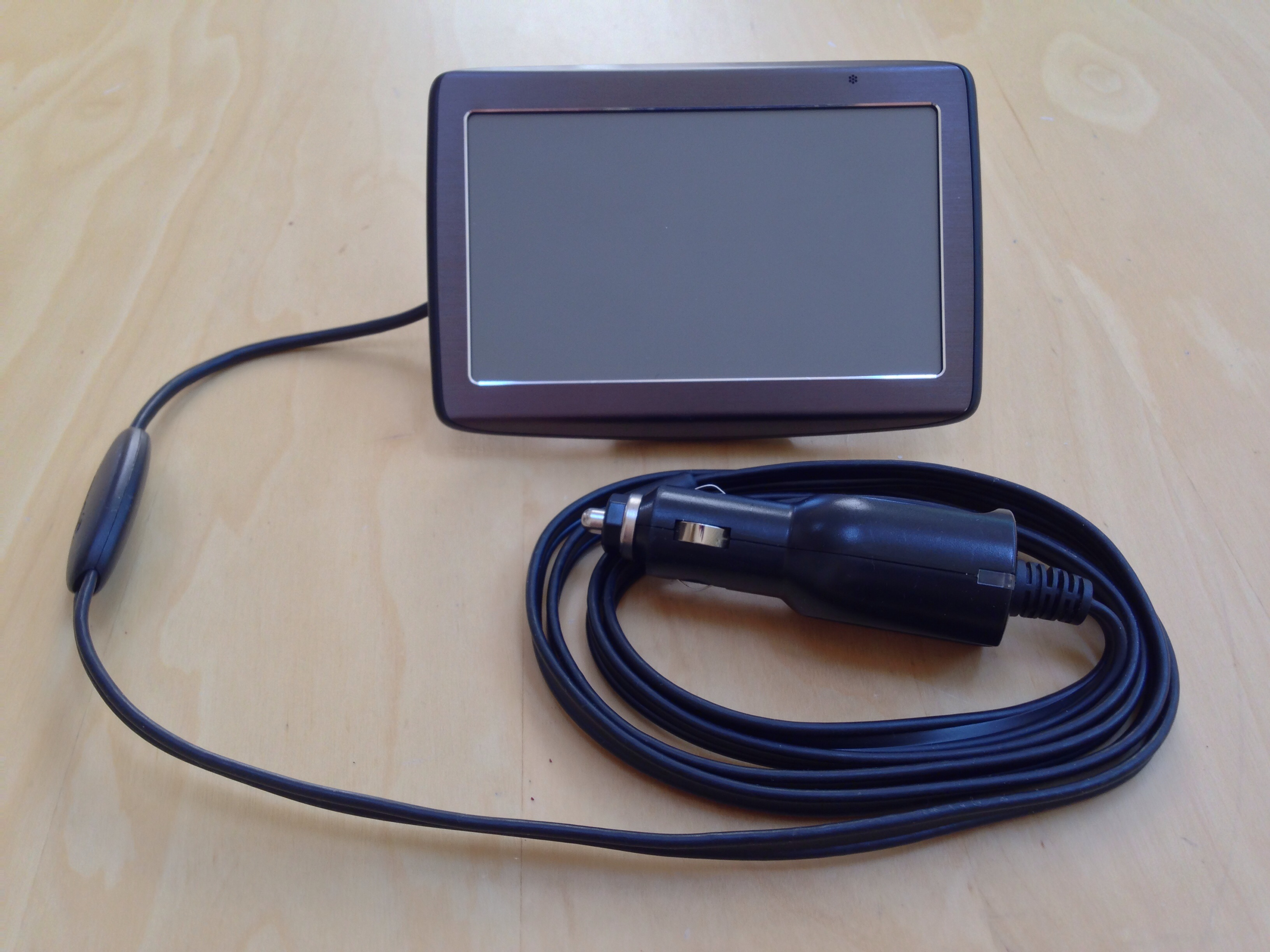
A Radio Data System – Traffic Message Channel (RDS-TMC) receiver (left) attached to a TomTom navigation system via a USB cable. The other side of the receiver is connected to a car charger via an antenna-power combination cable.

== Development ==
Detailed technical proposals for an RDS-TMC broadcasting protocol were first developed in the European Community's DRIVE programme research project RDS-ALERT, a partnership of the BBC, Philips, Blaupunkt, TRRL and CCETT led by Castle Rock Consultants (CRC). The main goal of the project was to develop and build consensus upon a draft standard for broadcasting RDS-TMC traffic messages in densely coded digital form.

An initial proposal for defining RDS-TMC data fields had been made to the European Conference of Ministers of Transport (ECMT) in Madrid, based on a scheme developed by CCETT and Philips in the Eureka-sponsored CARMINAT research project. This proposal required the use of at least two 104-bit RDS data groups for each message. Within these RDS Groups, 32 bits per group would be used for traffic data, giving a total traffic message length of 64 bits. A second proposal, by Bosch-Blaupunkt and the German Road Research Institute BASt, sought to use just a single RDS Group per traffic message. Then, in 1987, the CEC invited Castle Rock Consultants to lead a joint team that would take TMC development a stage further. CRC produced a proposal for a modified BASt/Blaupunkt single group message definition, which became known as the ALERT A coding scheme. Tests also continued at CCETT and BBC on the CARMINAT approach, which formed the basis of an alternative ALERT B coding proposal.

A major question addressed in the Alert A scheme was the total number of traffic event locations to be coded. Initial estimates suggested that, in Europe, a maximum of 65,000 significant junctions might be needed for the Federal Republic of Germany. An efficient coding system would require only 16 bits to code these, simply by numbering each intersection from 1 to 65535. Calculations for France, Britain and elsewhere suggested that around 30,000 to 40,000 locations should be enough for most European national or U.S. statewide systems. A standard 16-bit location code was, therefore, adopted for inter-urban networks. The Madrid proposal of 1987, by comparison, had required 33 bits to code problem location, with separate fields for road number, road class, area of the country, etc. These 33 bits gave a theoretical total of 8.5 billion location codes, most of which could never be used.

After consultation with ECMT, a combined approach was developed called the ALERT C Protocol that aimed to combine the best features of each approach. ALERT A and C replaced the CARMINAT message categories cause, effect and advice with a single 11-bit basic message code. This permits up to 2048 basic message phrases to be broadcast. The new ALERT protocols significantly increased the efficiency of message coding, shortening the basic message content from 18 to 11 bits. In conjunction with the revised location codes, which saved 17 of the 33 bits previously assigned, this allowed the great majority of traffic messages to be broadcast using a single TMC data sequence. In 1991, ECMT recommended moving forward with further testing of the protocols. The work continued with a larger consortium including Volvo and Ford Motor Company in the European Commission's DRIVE II project ATT-ALERT.

== Operation ==
Each traffic incident is binary-encoded and sent as a TMC message. Each message consists of an event code, location code, expected incident duration, affected extent and other details.

The message contains a list of up to 2048 event phrases defined by 11 binary bits (of which 1402 were in use as of 2007) that can be translated by the receiver into the user's language. Some phrases describe individual situations such as a crash, while others cover combinations of events such as construction causing long delays.

In Europe, location code tables are maintained on a national level. Those location tables are integrated in the maps provided by in-vehicle navigation system companies such as HERE Technologies and TomTom and by vehicle manufacturers such as Volvo. In other countries, such as the U.S. and Canada, private companies maintain the location tables and market TMC services commercially.

Sources of traffic information typically include police, traffic control centers, camera systems, traffic speed detectors, floating car data, winter driving reports and roadwork reports.

== Coordination ==
TMC-Forum, a non-profit organization whose members included service providers, receiver manufacturers, car manufacturers, map vendors, broadcasters (public and private), automobile clubs, and public authorities, was a forum to discuss traffic information related matters. It maintained the TMC-Standard (ISO 14819). On 11 November 2007, the TMC-Forum and the TPEG-Forum merged into the Traveller Information Services Association (TISA). TISA has taken over all of TMC-Forum's activities and responsibilities.

== Functionality ==
RDS-TMC is a low-bandwidth system. Each RDS-TMC traffic message comprises 37 data bits sent at most 1–3 times per second, using a low capacity data channel primarily designed for FM radio station name identification and tuning. Compressing traffic incident descriptions in multiple languages into 16 bits for a location, 11 bits for an event description code, plus 3 bits for the event's extent and a few extra bits for the duration/system management was necessary due to pre-existing constraints in the RDS standard. Almost all the other broadcast data bits were already assigned from each 104-bit RDS Group.

A major design challenge of RDS-TMC was to find a way of describing traffic event locations across an entire state or country. Such a system could not convey precise latitude-longitude data (available 25 years later using GPS in applications such as Waze). Instead, RDS-TMC relies on the use of location tables that point only to significant highway junctions. The precision of each traffic event's location is low compared to that of modern smartphone devices. The user's navigation system locates a driver to about 3 metres (10 feet), but only knows, for example, that a crash took place between Exit 3 and Exit 4, northbound on a particular motorway. This limitation requires that traffic events (accidents, congestion, burst water mains, faulty traffic lights, etc.) have to be superimposed onto maps by mapping the reported location to the TMC location table. If the nearest location table point lies at some distance from the exact position of the incident, then the report appears on a section of main road between two junctions instead of at its exact location. The limited precision can make a significant difference as to how navigation devices interpret the incident, potentially leading to an occasional poor route choice.

In the US and elsewhere, systems such as CARS (Condition Acquisition and Reporting System) can pinpoint event locations or their start and end points with one-metre precision. These real-time data are published in XML for access by companies such as Google and TomTom. These incident reports can be delivered to mobile phones and handheld devices in vehicles. However, major real-world traffic incidents usually spread from hundreds of metres up to many kilometres, once traffic backups have developed. On motorways and other major roads, there are typically few or no detours available between significant junctions, which are all included in the TMC location tables. Many traffic report locations are only approximate, and as queues grow, locations can change swiftly. So GPS-based systems are more precise, but are not necessarily more accurate.

== Security ==
In April 2007, two Italian security researchers presented research about RDS-TMC at the CanSecWest security conference. The presentation, entitled "Unusual Car Navigation Tricks", raised the point that RDS-TMC is a wireless cleartext protocol and showed how to build a receiver and transmitter with inexpensive electronics capable of injecting false and potentially dangerous messages.

Detailed instructions and schematics were published in Issue No. 64 of Phrack hacking magazine.

The TMC Forum responded by stating that the effects of any 'pirate' TMC broadcasts would be non-existent on users not on routes affected by fake obstruction messages and that such broadcasts would directly interfere with that country's TMC carrier station, which would lead to criminal or civil liability. They stated that it was therefore unlikely that such activity would take place.

Actual RDS-TMC attacks have been known to occur, for instance in Belgium in 2019 where road users were warned of "air raids on the E40 road" in March and that "firefights broke out on the E17" in August . Official government advice was to ignore these messages, local police services admitted that locating the source of the transmissions was going to be difficult and that – even though clearly communication laws were broken – arrests or convictions were unlikely.

== Devices and navigation programs ==
An RDS-TMC receiver is a special FM radio tuner that can decode TMC data. Satellite TMC receivers use a dedicated data channel that is broadcast as part of much larger broadcast digital audio channels. TMC data is decoded by matching event and location codes against look-up tables of phrases and locations. The results can be translated into audio or visually displayed on a Sat nav device. The look-up tables must be implemented in a service-specific database mapped to geographic routes and intersections. As with the navigation systems themselves, periodic upgrades are needed as the road system changes. This provides opportunities for vendors to generate revenue.

The technical concepts of RDS-TMC originated about 30 years ago, initially by Blaupunkt and Philips. With European Commission funding, the BBC, Transport Research Laboratory and CCETT came together in a team led by Castle Rock Consultants to develop the standard. More recently, personal navigation devices (PND) have emerged as an alternative way to deliver traffic information via mobile devices employing GPS.

Automobile companies continue to roll out RDS-TMC products. One reason is that the use of mobile devices is attracting legislative attention due to concerns about driver distraction. Like car radios, in-vehicle navigation systems have not so far generated the same concerns and may continue to outsell handheld solutions.

Higher-end models of personal navigation assistants come with a built-in TMC receiver, and depending on the country, the service is available in Eclipse, Garmin, iPhone (Navigon), Navman, Navway, Mio, Pioneer, TomTom and Uniden navigation systems, as well as in Volvo, BMW and Ford Falcon navigation systems, among many others.

TMC adapters can extend mobile navigation systems with integrated GPS receivers with TMC functionality. They can include a bluetooth or USB connection. The adapter passes traffic messages to the navigation software for route calculations. The adapters generally include a connector for FM/TMC, an antenna (2,5mm phone jack or MCX jack 50 Ohm). Compatible navigation programs include AvMap, Destinator PN, Falk Navigator TMC Edition (special version for MyGuide Navigator 6500XL TMC Bundle), GoPal, iGO, Mireo, Navigon MN5, Route 66, and Sygic.

== Coverage ==
In some places, TMC coverage is smaller than that of the radio programme carrying the TMC service, therefore white spots exist. For example, in the US, one of the two TMC commercial services is run by Clear Channel Communications, whose 95 FM station urban markets typically have some level of traffic information service. Another is Sirius Satellite Radio, which covers all of North America, including sparsely populated rural areas and near-empty deserts. Although vendors are beginning to make arrangements with information systems such as CARS, operated by state police and state departments of transportation, coverage is likely to remain sketchy in some states during the next few years.

== Operation worldwide ==
The following countries provide a TMC service:

=== Australia ===
Intelematics Australia broadcasts a national encrypted RDS-TMC service focused initially on urban Australia under the brand 'SUNA Traffic Channel'. The service reaches around 85% of urban Australia, using commercial FM broadcasters in seven cities, as well as via XML for online and smartphone applications. The service is available on GPS navigation systems including Navman, Mio, Uniden, iPhone (Navigon & Sygic), Eclipse, Pioneer, Alpine and Clarion. SUNA Traffic Channel is also available in Ford, Holden, Honda, Toyota, Nissan, Mercedes-Benz, and many other navigation systems. SUNA is currently the only source of comprehensive, metropolitan congestion monitoring content in Australia – proprietary technology interfaces to traffic light control systems. The SUNA broadcast service is fully compliant with both RDS and TMC. However, since the broadcast is encrypted it does not work on in-car GPS navigation systems that do not have a commercial arrangement with SUNA.

=== Austria ===
In Austria, ORF broadcasts a free service on radio channels Ö1, Ö2 (9 regional channels), Hitradio Ö3 and FM4. It is supported by the Federal Ministry of Innovation, Mobility and Infrastructure (BMIMI). ASFINAG is responsible for the location table, currently version 3.9, which received updates to handle increased use during Euro 2008. Its location table contains around 18,000 codes.

=== Baltic region ===
Mediamobile Nordic plans to broadcast traffic information in the Baltic region. As of 2014, no service is reportedly available in Latvia, Lithuania or Estonia, although location tables (maintained by Destia) were certified by TISA in 2008. As of 2017, an unencrypted TMC service is available on Viker Raadio in Estonia. Mediamobile has a traffic information center in Estonia for the Nordic region.

=== Belgium ===
Belgium hosts TMC services: TMOBILIS in Belgium, TIC-VL in Flanders and RTBF in Wallonia and Brussels. Except for TMOBILIS, they are all currently open services.

TMOBILIS is provided by Be-Mobile and Touring Mobilis. It is the only fully Belgian service. It combines all Belgian sources from the Flemish, Walloon and Brussels government, police stations, a national Floating Car Data system based on GPS positions from vehicles and the Touring Mobilis call center. It is nationally broadcast by both VRT on Studio Brussel for Flanders and RTBF on Classic 21 in Wallonia and Brussels.

TIC-VL is broadcast by VRT on Radio 2 and uses content from the Vlaams Verkeerscentrum. Coverage of content and transmissions is limited to Flanders.

In Wallonia and Brussels, CLASS.21 is broadcast by RTBF on Classic 21. The service is from the Centre PEREX of the Service public de Wallonie (SPW, formerly MET) in collaboration with TMC4U. Coverage of transmissions and content are limited to Wallonia and Brussels.

Technum creates the location tables by order of the regional communities. Since December 2004 broadcast messages use location table version 1.4b, which added N-roads. The latest version is 2.9.

=== Bulgaria ===
A national TMC service for Bulgaria started beta testing in December 2010. The service is provided by TrafficNav, a Budapest based traffic information company in cooperation with the broadcast hardware manufacturer Kvarta. Data sources include real time traffic information provided by tix.bg, presently for Sofia. The service can be accessed by most Garmin navigation devices and will soon be supported in several factory car navigation devices.

=== Colombia ===
Legislation does not allow the insertion of external digital data into analogue FM transmissions and the use of RDS-TMC technology is also banned.

=== Czechia ===
TMC developments in the Czech Republic are coordinated by CEDA, which is responsible for the location table. Its current version is 4.1, containing more than 16,000 records.

There were 3 providers of TMC service in Czech republic:

JSDI – transmitted on Český rozhlas Radiožurnál – is a free TMC service provided by the Czech Road Motorway Directorate (ŘSD ČR). Content consists of closures, road restrictions and winter maintenance across the country, accident information from rescue services and detailed content from TIC Prague. In December 2022, service moved from FM network of Český rozhlas Vltava to Český rozhlas Radiožurnál due to much better country coverage.

DIC PRAHA – transmitted on frequency of Český rozhlas Plus – 92.6 MHz, provided detailed traffic information for Prague only

Cloesed TMC services:

TELEASIST – (TMC service switched off in 2017) was transmitted on radio network of Český rozhlas Radiožurnál and available countrywide. Information were provided by Teleasist together with Global Assistance.

=== Denmark ===
The free TMC service DK-TMC in Denmark is operated by Vejdirektoratet or DRD (Danish Road Directorate). It is broadcast on DR P1, P3 and P4. DRD is also responsible for the location table. The current version is 11.1 and contains around 10,000 location codes.

=== Finland ===
V-Traffic, the commercial service in Finland, is provided by MediaMobile since 2007. The service covers the largest cities and roads 1–999, covering the whole country. TMC messages are broadcast nationally on Yle Radio Suomi. V-Traffic uses several information sources to broadcast validated traffic data, including floating car data as well as data from public authorities, traffic cameras, radio stations, road users and several partnership companies. The service is encrypted, based on specifications set by the TISA. The service is available on the majority of navigation units sold in new cars, such as Volkswagen, Audi, Seat, Opel, Volvo, Toyota, Lexus, Mercedes-Benz, Subaru, Suzuki and Skoda, as well as portable navigation devices from Garmin.

The location table is public and provided by Finnish Traffic Agency. The latest version, V2.1, contains approximately 28.000 locations points.

TMC service has been discontinued in Finland on 29.12.2023

=== France ===
Only commercial RDS-TMC traffic broadcast services are available in France.

The commercial service V-Traffic is provided by Mediamobile, a subsidiary of TDF, with two shareholders: Renault and Vinci. The traffic service provides real-time information on 185,000 km of main roads in France, including all highways (11 800 km). It is transmitted on the frequencies of France Inter and is received nationally (99% national coverage). The service is not encrypted, but restricts access using different location table numbers. In 2010 the company signed a partnership with Météo-France for a common road weather hazard service.

Another commercial service is provided by ViaMichelin and Carte Blanche Conseil, transmitted by the Towercast network (NRJ group). In September 2005 PSA Peugeot Citroën signed a partnership with ViaMichelin.

A free TMC service was offered by Autoroute FM but discontinued in 2012.

Location tables are released by the government agency SETRA. The latest version 10.1, was certified by TISA in 2013 and released in 2014. It covers 184 913 km of roads in France, and contains about 25 984 location data points.

=== Germany ===
Germany offers both public and commercial services. The public service is an open, free service that can be received via public radio stations.

The other service, TMCpro, is a pay service provided by Navteq Services GmbH and owned by Navteq. It was developed and originally provided by T-Systems Traffic GmbH, a subsidiary of T-Systems that was bought by Navteq in January 2009. The service went live across Germany at the beginning of 2005. The content is provided by ddg Gesellschaft für Verkehrsdaten mbh, a wholly owned subsidiary of T-Systems Traffic GmbH. It is an encrypted service based on the conditional access specifications of the TMC Forum.

BASt, the German Federal Highway Research Institute, releases location tables. In version 5.1 all major access roads leading to football arenas that were used in the World Championship in 2006 were added. The current version is 10.1 and contains 44,233 location codes.

=== Greece ===
A TMC-service has been available in the Attica region since September 2010, to be rolled out for nationwide coverage in 2011. The service is provided by TrafficNav, a Budapest-based traffic information company, and is available on Galaxy Radio and Radio DeeJay. The service can be accessed by most Garmin and Mio navigation devices and is to be featured in several built-in car navigation devices.

A second TMC-service is provided by Be-Mobile, a service provider based in Belgium. The service is available via Sentra FM.

=== Hungary ===
A national TMC-service has been available since 2008. The service is provided by TrafficNav, the Budapest traffic information company and is available on the national FM networks of Petőfi Radio (Channel 2 of Magyar Rádió, Hungary's State Radio). In 2020 service moved from national FM network to local InfoRádió Budapest (88,1 MHz). The service is encrypted and can be accessed by most navigation devices manufactured by TomTom, Garmin, Navigon, Mio and Navon, and is featured in several built-in car navigation devices, including selected models of Volvo, Toyota and Lexus. The service is based on V2.0 of the Hungary location table.

Service has been completely switched off in 2024.

=== Indonesia ===
In October 2009, GEWI Europe GmbH & Co. KG released the TISA certified Location Table version 1.0 for Indonesia. GEWI's updated Location Table version 1.1 was certified by TISA on 14 Mar 2012.

In September 2011, iQios Sejahtera launched the first real-time traffic service in Indonesia.

=== Iran ===
TMC service is currently unavailable, although the infrastructure is in place; originally for use by the Iranian National Broadcasting Company (IRIB). The service is expected to become publicly available in 2020.

Rayan amin company has begun research in this area

=== Ireland ===
TMC for Dublin went live in November 2010. The service was extended to provide national coverage later that year. The service is provided by TrafficNav, the Budapest traffic information company and is available on RTÉ Radio 1, a national FM network of Ireland's State Radio. Data sources include real time traffic information provided by Dublin City Council. The service can be accessed by most Garmin navigation devices and will soon be featured in several built-in car navigation devices.

=== Israel ===
A commercial RDS-TMC service was initiated by Decell Technologies in February 2011. Decell provides national coverage broadcast by several regional radio stations. The content distribution relies on Decell's TISA certified TMC location table 36. Decell provides real-time flow and incident traffic data on RDS-TMC to all leading navigation companies.

=== Italy ===
A free public RDS-TMC service became available in Italy on 1 July 1998, offered by RAI. CCISS (National Traffic Information Centre) provides the service. RAI broadcasts on Rai Radio 1, Radio2 and Radio 3 FM. This service covers the entire country. Additionally, Rai operates a dedicated traffic news station heavily focusing on motorway viability which trasmits on the fixed frequency of 103.3 FM, Rai Isoradio.

A commercial service is provided by radio station RTL 102.5 in cooperation with InfoBlu. This service covers 90% of the population of Italy, and is still expanding coverage. It has been encrypted since 2007.

The Italian location table, provided by RAI-CCISS, is in version 2.1 with around 12.500 codes.

As of April 2018, the location table was at version 4.3 with more than 41,000 codes. It has all highways, state roads, county roads and urban roads for main towns.

As of September 2025, the database is at version 4.8.

=== Netherlands ===
In the Netherlands there are private and public TMC services.

The private service is provided by VID in cooperation with Be-Mobile, and broadcast via Radio 2 and 3FM.

One free services is provided by ANWB in collaboration with technology provider Simacan. The service is broadcast via radio stations Sky Radio, Radio Veronica and BNR Nieuwsradio.

Another free service is provided by VID in cooperation with Be-Mobile, and broadcast via Radio 1 and Radio 538.

Location tables come from Nationaal Dataportaal Wegverkeer. The current version is 9.2, in use since 4 June 2014.

=== New Zealand ===
The New Zealand Automobile Association broadcasts traffic alerts via FM broadcast radio in and around Greater Auckland, Wellington and Christchurch.

=== Norway ===
Since 2009, NRK is testing an open TMC service. The open service is transmitted using the P1-frequency. NRK broadcasts information on road works, planned closures and winter-closed mountain passes. Updates on accidents and other unforeseen information are currently done Mon-Fri 05.30–22.00, Sat 09.30–17.00 and Sun 13.00–22.00.

Commercial radio station P4 and Mediamobile is providing a TMC service called V-Traffic in Norway. This service is encrypted but free for all private users when the navigator manufacturer has included it in its product.

The Norwegian FM network will be closed in January 2017 and with that, it is foreseen that all TMC services will be closed. Since 2014, P4 and Mediamobile are running a Digital Radio service that replaces the RDS-TMC in Norway. This service goes under the name V-Traffic DAB.

Statens vegvesen, the Norwegian Public Roads Administration (NPRA), provides location tables.

=== Poland ===
On 1 May 2010, commercial TMC service became available in Poland, transmitted by radio station RMF FM. The service, called V-Traffic, is provided by Mediamobile, a subsidiary of the TDF Group, one of the biggest providers of broadcast services in Europe, based in Paris.

In Poland, service is available in PND devices: Garmin, Mio and Becker as well as in car embedded navigations used by Toyota, Volvo and Ford. The service is built on more than 100 different sources, processed automatically (Floating Car Data) or manually by operators in Mediamobile Traffic Information Centre based in Warsaw. Minimum guaranteed signal coverage is 95% of the population and 93% geographical coverage.

In November 2012, CE-Traffic launched commercial TMC service in Poland – Premium RDS-TMC. CE-Traffic partnered with EuroZET media group that is a part of Lagardère Group, in order to provide connectivity country-wide. The service is based on CE-Traffic data generated from Floating Car Data systems fused with journalistic information. It is available for major interconnecting roads, urban streets in 15 major cities, and other roads commonly used by drivers as shortcuts or alternative routes. The location table includes future changes in the backbone network until the end of 2013.

In March 2025, TMC service has been switched off in Poland.

=== Portugal ===
Since March 2011 TMC has been carried on RFM radio, provided by Be-mobile. Be-Mobile released TMC table version 1.1. Navteq Maps editions since Q3/2011 now provide TMC coverage for Portugal. There are now three TMC channels in Portugal.

Recently, Summer Blast radio was included in the TMC providing coverage for Portugal.

=== Romania ===
Starting 30 May 2012, TMC service is available in Romania, on private radio station (ProFM). The service is provided by TrafficNav.

TraficOK was the first TMC system tested and implemented in Romania. The system uses a location table of over 11,500 entries, which provides nearly full coverage of the Romanian road infrastructure. The table was developed by AROBS and certified by TISA – Traveller Information Services Association. Data on traffic flow, events, weather warnings, road repairs and traffic jams is collected from several sources. The TraficOK project was developed by AROBS Transilvania Software and Be-Mobile. Messages are sent via Europa FM radio stations (in FM bandwidth) to various hardware equipment (navigation systems, mobile phones, etc.) equipped with TMC modules.

TraficOK was planned to be available in Bucharest, Ploiești, Pitești, Constanța, Brașov, Cluj-Napoca, Târgu Mureș, Oradea, Arad, Timișoara, Iași and Bacău.

=== Singapore ===
In June 2006, GEWI Europe GmbH & Co. KG released the first TISA certified TMC Location Table for Singapore. Its Singapore company, GEWI Asia Pacific Pte. Ltd. offered the service. The latest location table version 1.3, updated and certified in March 2014, includes the Marina Coastal Expressway, more than 150 car park locations within the Central Business District and downtown areas. GEWI's traffic services are available on several models of Smartphones, PAPAGO!, Garmin and TomTom navigation devices, Honda and Toyota in-car navigation systems.

In Nov 2010, the Land Transport Authority announced the release of the Location Table for Singapore. Quantum Inventions offers a traffic data service based on this location table and includes traffic incidents information, traffic speeds, parking availability, weather, road closures, etc. Various brands of GPS systems using the Galactio software provide these dynamic data in the navigation system.

=== Slovakia ===
There is public RDS-TMC service running in Slovakia.

"SSC RTVS" – is a free public TMC service transmitting on the network of Slovensky Rozhlas – Radio Slovensko. Transmitted content consist mainly of static information – roadworks and closures. Information transmitted in this service are shown also on web www.zjazdnost.sk of Slovenska sprava ciest.

"DECELL (SK)" – was a paid service, which was launched in May 2013 and closed in March 2025. Messages were transmitted countrywide on the private station Fun Radio. Information consists of current traffic situation provided by CE-Traffic a.s and is available exclusively for owners of Garmin navigation devices.

In September 2018, a new version 4.0 of location tables was issued, covering all highways and all important roads. This version replaced older version 3.2 released in 2014.

=== Slovenia ===
A national TMC-service became available in June 2009. The service is provided by TrafficNav, the Budapest traffic information company and is available on two national FM networks of Radiotelevizija Slovenija, Slovenia's National Public Radio (ARS and Radio SI). The service can be accessed by most Garmin, Navigon and Navo navigation devices and will soon be featured in several factory fitted car navigation devices. The service is based on V3.0 of the Slovenia location table.

The Motorway Company in the Republic of Slovenia prepared a new location table DARS 702–35, V1.1 which is freely available for integration in maps. The service is also transmitted on two national FM networks of Radiotelevizija Slovenija, Slovenia's National Public Radio (Prvi and Radio Val 202).

=== South Africa ===
Garmin was first to offer the service in South Africa, in time for the FIFA Soccer World Cup in 2010. Navigon coming on board shortly thereafter.

TMC services in South Africa have been available since late 2009, a service provided by Altech Netstar. In partnership with INRIX, Altech Netstar broadcasts their Premium Traffic Service throughout Gauteng, Kwa-Zulu Natal and Western Cape Peninsula. The company planned to launch in Orange Free State, Eastern Cape and Mpumalanga in 2012. Altech Netstar offers a commercial service to its OEM and Commercial Customers. Altech Netstar broadcasts XML services to their device partners and wholesale customers.

=== Spain ===
A TMC service is available in Spain on RNE 3. It is provided by SCT as the operator of traffic management in Catalonia Autonomous Community, DT in the Basque Country Autonomous Community and DGT (Traffic General Directorate) for the rest of the country.

Road network coverage is the motorways, national roads and first level roads that belong to the Autonomous Communities. RACC is working on urban services, starting with Seville and Barcelona to broadcast on RNE 2.

Location tables are provided by DGT, Dirección General de Tráfico. The current version is 2.1 and contains about 7,750 entries.

=== Sweden ===
The most used TMC service in Sweden is run by Mediamobile under the name V-Traffic Premium RDS-TMC. It is a fully encrypted service with focus on congestions, slippery road warnings and other safety related messages for the driver.

A public service was available in Sweden. Swedish Transport Administration, or Trafikverket, was responsible for the location tables. Version v2.3 contained about 17337 data points, and covered 1138000 km of the Sweden road network.

The public service has not been developed since 2009 when the government decided to stop distribution of end user services. The service ended in August 2022.

Sweden is divided into 8 broadcasting zones to avoid transmitting traffic information that is not useful at that location. They cover the European, national and major county highways. The service is broadcast on Sveriges Radio P3 radio station and covers 98 percent of Sweden.

Swedish Transport Administration (Trafikverket) has an information page for Trafikverket RDS-TMC in Swedish.

=== Switzerland ===
A TMC service is available in Switzerland. The broadcaster is SRG SSR idée suisse or Swiss Broadcasting Corporation who transmits TMC on FM chain 1 and FM chain 3 all over Switzerland.

- In German speaking areas: Radio SRF 1 (G) / Radio SRF 3 (G) / RTS Première (F) / RSI Rete Uno (I) partly
- In French speaking areas: RTS Première (F) / RTS Couleur 3 (F) / Radio SRF 1 (G) / RSI Rete Uno (I) partly
- In Italian speaking areas: RSI Rete Uno (I) / RSI Rete Tre (I) / Radio SRF 1 (G) / RTS Première (F)

Daughter company Viasuisse operates the service.

Location codes are the responsibility of the Swiss Federal Roads Authority FEDRO but B+S Ingenieur (Bundesamt für Strassen) distributes the location tables. Version 5.5 contains around 10,000 codes.

=== Taiwan ===
The Taiwanese police radio station and Ministry of Transportation and Communication (MOTC) both broadcast RDS-TMC traffic data. It is currently available for TomTom, Garmin, Panasonic, PaPaGo and Mio devices.

=== Turkey ===
Turkey has 3 RDS TMC services. 1: HERE (previously NAVTEQ) has the broadest RDS-TMC service in Turkey, covering the largest 11 cities in the country: Istanbul, Ankara, Adana, Bursa, Mersin, Izmir, Eskisehir, Antalya, Konya, Kayseri and Gaziantep. The service was launched in July 2012. 2: TMC service in Turkey has been published by Basarsoft and TrafficNav in 2012. RDS TMC is available only in the cities where the traffic congestions are a big problem for the people. Istanbul, Ankara, Izmir, Antalya, Bursa are the cities where broadcasting is being done. 3: TMC service in Turkey was published by Be-Mobile and Infotech in 2012. The RDS TMC service is available in Istanbul, Ankara, Izmir, Bursa and Antalya.

All 3 Turkish TMC services are paid services and users can have it in Navigation devices. Both PND and Automotive products are using TMC service in Turkey.

=== United Kingdom ===
The INRIX provides a commercial TMC service, iTMC in the United Kingdom. It is broadcast nationally on Classic FM and other commercial radio stations. The BBC Charter prohibits it from carrying a commercial service. ITIS provides traffic data on RDS-TMC to major automotive companies (BMW, Mercedes, Toyota, Ford, Renault, Jaguar Land Rover and others). The price of the service is included in the price of the car or navigation system.

This system uses Floating Vehicle Data, which include positional information from over 160,000 fleet vehicles fitted. The data is complemented by journalistic or "Incident" data provided by Trafficlink. Trafficlink is owned by ITIS and provides traffic and travel bulletins to BBC Radio and to over 95% of the UK commercial radio stations. Incident data includes road works, accidents and closures.

Trafficmaster, a Teletrac Navman brand, operated a national service using local and regional radio broadcaster Global Radio which provided reception across mainland Britain. This system used road-side infrastructure to measure vehicle travel time between sensors placed a few miles apart, and used number plate recognition technology. Data sources used by Teletrac Navman included Floating Vehicle data from fitted telematics devices, 8500 under-road inductance loops, over 1800 CCTV cameras, Congestion Zone charging cameras, Police control rooms plus a proprietary network of ANPR and IR sensors cameras across the road network. Teletrac Navman provided traffic data on RDS-TMC to major automotive OEM brands including VW, Audi, Skoda, Mazda, Chrysler, Honda, Seat and Vauxhall. Teletrac Navman also supplies the Department for Transport with historical traffic data for modelling purposes which is used by central and local governments and their sub-contractors when analyzing road network improvement opportunities. The Trafficmaster service via RDS-TMC was withdrawn at the end of March 2023.

Both services maintain their own location tables. The current location table version of ITIS is 5.1. The last location table version of Trafficmaster was 3.1.

=== United States and Canada ===
In the United States of America, XM Satellite Radio and Sirius Satellite Radio provide TMC service all over the US. Navteq provides traffic data to both providers. Navteq Traffic delivers traffic information and related advertising via RDS and HD signals to navigation devices nationwide. Navteq also provided traffic data sourced from sensors, probes and other technologies in 10+ countries as of December 2009. INRIX, Inc. fuses TMC data with real-time flow information from its crowd-sourced network of floating cars and mobile devices with information from other public and private sources to deliver real-time and predictive traffic information.

iHeartMedia and Tele Atlas have a TMC service called Total Traffic & Weather Network (TTWN) (also iHeartMedia's branding for traffic and weather reporting), using FM RDS in 77 US cities and three Canadian metropolitan areas. These services are both offered by subscription and were initially available to many in-car navigation units via an expansion module purchased separately.

The TomTom RDS-TMC Traffic Receiver acquires information through an FM signal broadcast by Clear Channel's regional providers. By connecting a compatible TomTom navigation device to the RDS-TMC Traffic Receiver, users receive traffic information via the TMC connection. Traffic alerts appear in the traffic bar on the right side of the screen. Tapping the traffic bar reveals further information, such as accident or traffic delays. The RDS-TMC Traffic Receiver is compatible with the TomTom VIA series, GO 920, TomTom GO 720, TomTom ONE XL and TomTom ONE 3rd edition. It integrates RDS-TMC Traffic information with TomTom GO and ONE products.

In addition to these after-market services, six major motor manufacturers offer RDS-TMC as standard in their U.S. vehicles, including Volvo and BMW.

iBiquity HD Radio provides a TMC service based on RDS-TMC.

=== Other areas ===
In the Netherlands, a map of current and planned TMC service is available from the Traffic Message Channel.

In Luxembourg, no service is currently planned.

A location table for UAE v4.0 has been certified.

In Turkey, various location tables are available.

In China, investigations are ongoing to choose a technology for its traffic information system. The main candidates are the Japanese system VICS and the European TMC. A TMC Location table version 1.0 has already been certified. Following the advancement of 4G/5G and IoT, China is actively planning in using 5G to broadcast traffic message and Hong Kong is also in the path. Several consultations in ITIS and Electric Vehicle are proceeding in 2019.

In Serbia, an RDS-TMC system along A1 highway started in July 2019, however with limitations.

== See also ==
- Bluetooth
- Google Maps
- Intelligent transportation system
- Yahoo! Maps Traffic
