= GEWI =

- Type: Private
- Industry: Traffic and Travel information services
- Founded: 1992
- Founder: Hagen Geppert, Dr. Karl Will
- Headquarters: Bernburg, Germany
- Subsidiaries: GEWI North America, LLC, USA.
- Website: www.gewi.com

GEWI is a German software company founded in 1992 by Hagen Geppert and Karl Will, headquartered in Bernburg, Germany. The company name is formed from the first two letters of the surnames of its founders - Geppert and Will. GEWI develops traffic and travel information software, with its main product, the Traffic Information Center (TIC), used in 31 countries for applications including real-time navigation data, road incident management, and traffic news broadcasting.

The company operates through two entities: GEWI Europe, based in Germany with offices in Bernburg and Leipzig, and GEWI North America, based in Sugar Land, Texas.

== GEWI Business ==
The company consists of two corporations: GEWI Europe based in Germany with offices in Bernburg and Leipzig. Hagen Geppert serves as Worldwide CEO. GEWI North America is located in Sugar Land (Houston) Texas and managed by North America CEO Jim O'Neill. Additional offices are located in the UK and USA. GEWI has a global customer base and has been ISO 9001 certified for quality standards annually since 1997, and is currently certified ISO 9001:2008.

== TIC Product ==
After its first generation of traffic data products, known as TMC Office, the company renamed the product to TIC (Traffic Information Center). TIC is a fully commercial off-the-shelf product (COTS) that customers can use to avoid problems associated with custom builds. Today, TIC is in its fourth generation and is used in 31 countries worldwide for a wide range of projects including traffic and travel information services (can include meteorological weather information), RDS-TMC, TPEG (over HTTP or digital broadcast such as DAB), navigation system testing (used by many device and car manufacturers), traffic news for radio (structured news reports auto-generated as ready by announcers), data harmonization and exchange, parking information, work zones (such as road construction), radio data using PAD (program associated data with station names, schedules, and music titles) and connected vehicles.

== Markets ==
The TIC Software is used by customers in commercial and government markets for a variety of traffic and travel related projects including:

=== Traffic and Travel Information Services ===
TIC can be used to collect and create a wide variety of data including traffic incidents, travel events, weather conditions, parking availability and pricing, and many more.

TIC allows data to be manually created by operators entering information using an easy-to-use dialog with drop-down lists, maps, and quick auto-completion. Data can be created using the TIC Client application on computers, iPad, or over internet connections. Data can also be automatically created from other data, for example, traffic and travel event data from traffic flow data

=== Road Incident Management ===
In 2015, GEWI added Road Incident Management (RIM) to the TIC Product features. The TIC Product feature Road Incident Management provides a method to integrate this information and allow agencies to manage road incidents (as well as traffic incidents), and to keep the public informed with accurate and updated traffic and travel information.

The TIC Product feature Road Incident Management provides a method to integrate this information and allow agencies to manage road incidents (as well as traffic incidents), and to keep the public informed with accurate and updated traffic and travel information.

TIC can be used to define and track pre-agreed incident response plans, providing operators with a step by step process to properly respond to traffic and roadway issues. By using TIC to track the response, each action is recorded, allowing for a full review of the implementation and timing of the response, in order to measure how well the incident was handled, and whether any improvements to the response could be made.

If the incident involves roadway infrastructure, such as road sensors or VMS signs, the status of each can be recorded as well, down to and including road surface conditions (from weather sensors) to better understand how an incident developed and on review, what could be done to prevent a reoccurrence.

TIC can be used to help support agency services such as ATIS (Advanced Transport Information Systems), and eCall, a European initiative being launched in 2018 for new vehicles.

A RIM video produced by GEWI which provides further details is available.

=== Real-time Information for Navigation ===
TIC can be used to collect and create traffic and travel messages that can be broadcast as Traffic Message Channel (TMC) messages with or without encryption over FM using the Radio Data Channel (RDS), or distributed over the Internet using connected services. TIC can regionalize and prioritize TMC messages, and can also be connected to RDS encoders at FM transmitter sites using the standard protocol UECP, as well as to FM receivers for RDS-TMC service monitoring.

Additionally, many car and navigation device manufacturers are able to provide more than just traffic and travel event information. They may also provide information about traffic flow, such as traffic speed, weather, and parking. This enhanced information is provided using TPEG, either broadcast or for an interactive driver experience with connected vehicle services, by using internet connections.

TIC can be used to collect and create traffic and travel event data, as well as collect traffic flow data such as speed and volume, all referenced to a harmonized road network. Traffic and travel event data can be automatically created from traffic flow data.

TIC can create as well as distribute standard TPEG TEC (Traffic Event Compact) and TPEG TFP (Traffic Flow and Prediction), referenced either to TMC locations or the standard AGORA-C and Open LR referencing methods used to dynamically encode and decode locations without using a fixed TMC location table. The TPEG messages can be distributed as either binary, over THTTP, as digital radio broadcasts such as DAB and HD, or in tpegML to exchange TPEG data with other service providers or systems.

=== Navigation System Testing ===
Car and navigation manufacturers must test their navigation devices to ensure their devices will work consistently at different locations with different data from traffic information service providers in order to avoid creating a new device for each market.

For RDS-TMC, TIC can be used in a test environment to broadcast traffic data samples provided by traffic information service providers, or manually created traffic event data, to RDS encoders connected to FM transmitters. TIC can also be used in a real FM broadcast environment to collect data and test broadcast quality.

For TPEG, TIC can be used to manually create traffic event and flow data, and to automatically convert this data into TPEG TEC and TPEG TFP messages which can then be distributed over internet HTTP using the standard THTTP request and response protocol. In addition to TPEG binary, the XML representation can also be distributed over many different protocols, such as DAB or FTP.

=== Traffic News for Radio ===
The TIC software can be used to create News reports which can be published for use by stations, broadcasters, and agencies. Data can be distributed to websites, smart phones apps, and other mobile device services. Standard data exchange formats are supported including IPTC and NewsML (XML).

Data can be compared and merged to reduce duplication and can be organized to increase relevance to the radio audience.

Producers can then use TIC to create news stories by selecting, grouping, and prioritizing traffic and travel events into a traffic news report. When different reporting styles and languages are required, these can be quickly and easily created.

Announcers can then read the traffic news on-air either using the station's own system or by using TIC's own newsreader feature to adjust, time, and scroll the news report.

=== Work Zone ===
TIC can be used both to collect and create work zone information using a TIC Client application on a mobile device or computer, or even from other systems and devices.

Captured or entered data can include a harmonized location reference, work type, status, times, and lane information such as restrictions, closures, and capacities.

Road conditions and restrictions can be manually entered by operators from reports or automatically collected using other systems. Each project can be reported as a whole, or in phases, depending on the requirements of the project. The Work zone projects can be scheduled in TIC, and can provide information on a consistent or recurrent basis as needed.

=== Radio Data ===
Radio stations can improve the listener experience by providing information that can be shown on displays built into radio receivers. The information is known as program associated data (PAD). PAD information can include the station and program name, song title and artist, and program schedules.

TIC can be used to collect and create PAD information and then adjust the timing of PAD information to match the content actually broadcast. TIC can regionalize PAD to the actual broadcast coverage by centrally managing the PAD data, thereby providing consistency across all broadcast media types, including FM Radio Data System (RDS) and Digital Audio Broadcast (DAB) transmitters, satellite, and internet.

Data to FM RDS encoders can include RadioText (RT), Alternative Frequencies (AF), and Traffic Message Channel (TMC). Data to DAB inserters can include Dynamic Label Service (DLS), TPEG applications, Broadcast Web Sites, Electronic Program Guide (EPG) using radio schedules collected from an existing system, and Slide Show such as traffic images from roadside cameras, logos, or advertisements.

=== ITS Asset Management ===
Government transport agencies worldwide manage and maintain many types of intelligent transport system (ITS) assets including cameras, traffic lights, ramp meters, VMS signs, road sensors and keep road users informed about the impact on traffic and travel. Agencies spend a lot of effort maintaining and repairing ITS assets which can be difficult when assets and project information are kept in several different places. TIC helps to reduce effort, time, and frustration by consistently managing assets all in one system.
