= TPEG =

Transport Protocol Experts Group, data protocol for traffic and travel information

The Transport Protocol Experts Group (TPEG) is a data protocol suite for traffic and travel related information. TPEG can be carried over different transmission media (bearers), such as digital broadcast or cellular networks (wireless Internet). TPEG applications include, among others, information on road conditions, weather, fuel prices, parking or delays of public transport.

== Overview ==
TPEG is a set of data protocols for carrying traffic & travel related information, comprising a range of different applications as well as basic building blocks to manage the transmission of the applications themselves, such as the handling of different messages belonging to a given application, grouping applications into data frames, or the updating and cancellation of messages. TPEG can be carried over different transmission media (bearers), such as digital broadcast or cellular networks (wireless Internet). TPEG applications include, among others, information on road conditions, weather, fuel prices, parking or delays of public transport.

== History ==
The Transport Protocol Experts Group was started in 1997 by the European Broadcasting Union (EBU). Work carried on under the auspices of the EBU until 2007, when the group merged with another group working on the Traffic Message Channel (TMC) protocol, hosted by ERTICO – ITS Europe and with the Mobile.Info project, where first prototypes of TPEG technology was tested under realistic driving conditions in various in-car navigation systems by a number of car manufacturers and their suppliers. Today, development work is carried out by the Traveller Information Services Association (TISA), who now also looks after the Alert-C standards used for implementing RDS-TMC services.

In the early days of the Transport Protocol Experts Group, the plan was to develop applications that could extend traffic information services far beyond existing technologies, such as RDS-TMC or proprietary protocols. Further, TPEG should include multi-modal traveller information services, facilitating roaming of travellers between different modes of transportation, e.g. between individual transportation (using a car) and public transportation (bus, subway, trains, ...). It all started with a Road Traffic Message (RTM) application, which was soon complemented by a Public Transport Information (PTI) application, which both shared a common native TPEG Location Referencing method.

TPEG RTM was intended as the "one size fits all" application. However, early implementations soon showed that the RTM structure was too broad to be used in navigation systems as a replacement for TMC. This first generation TPEG applications (TPEG generation 1, or TPEG1) also provided only a binary encoding, having in some cases a separate specification for the mapping to an XML encoding. Consequently, a revision of both the general information modelling style and the design approach was done, moving TPEG towards more clearly defined and separated applications for specific use cases and a top-down data modelling approach. This second generation TPEG applications (TPEG generation 2, or TPEG2) is now specified with an UML model, from which automatically both a binary encoding and XML encoding are derived. A TPEG2 application specification includes both the binary and XML encodings as integral part of the specification.

With the first TPEG2 TEC application, a breakthrough was achieved in a sense that both service providers and device manufacturers accepted TPEG2 as THE successor to TMC and deployments were rolled out in many countries.

Both TPEG1 and TPEG2 are standardized with the International Organization for Standardization as ISO/TS 18234 (TPEG1) and ISO/TS 21219 (TPEG2). TPEG1 is now considered a legacy system and the implementation of new services based on TPEG1 is discouraged.

== Technology ==
TPEG defines specifications for providing highly accurate traffic- and traveller information of many kinds. TPEG allows the transfer of data via different bearers e.g. digital broadcast or internet. In fact, today this is mainly used to inform travellers on roads, train tracks or even pedestrians. Information for a convenient journey e.g. on road conditions, weather, fuel prices, parking or delays of public transport are coded in TPEG.TPEG is a protocol with containers which carry specific content, for each service on a specific content so called 'applications' are defined in a separate technical specification. TPEG is designed to be modern and flexible, it is even more future proof, easy to adapt towards new trends, needs and conditions. Selecting the right applications and technical implementation profile, allows provision of safety relevant information to all travellers on time, accurately and precisely. Due to this major benefit, TPEG is also welcomed by regulators and public authorities. TPEG based products are already available in several European and Asian and American markets from different suppliers. Such products range from content creation/management over encoder/decoder equipment, test equipment and receiver/navigation devices to numerous services that are online worldwide. Further, encryption solutions are available for commercial services.

== TPEG design philosophy ==
TPEG is developed in a top-down fashion based on modeling use cases in the Unified Modeling Language (UML). Based on the UML modeling, two encoding versions are derived:

- Extensible Markup Language (XML) encoding – This format is human- and machine-readable and it can be easily rendered in navigation devices by parsing the XML structure. It is further backwards compatible in a way that new XML tags can be included in a given application, which would be simply skipped by older device populations that do not recognize these tags. New device populations can however benefit from the new features.
- Binary encoding – This format is not human-readable, but much more compact than its XML representation. Binary encoding is therefore frequently used when the available bandwidth is small and a compact encoding of services is of the essence.

== TPEG core principles ==
The following principles are considered as core in the development of the TPEG protocol, structure and semantics (see and).

TPEG:

- is designed for unidirectional (broadcast) and bi-directional communication channels (e.g. IP)
- binary versions are byte-oriented
- provides a protocol structure with asynchronous framing and a hierarchical data frame structure
- includes CRC error detection capabilities on different protocol levels
- assumes that the underlying communication layers provide error correction
- uses a transparent data channel
- facilitates transmission of service provider names, service names, network information, etc.
- permits the use of encryption mechanisms, e.g. for restricting access to commercial services

TPEG additional capabilities

TPEG:

- supports dynamic ("on-the-fly") location referencing methods and therefore does not need a preloaded location database (e.g. TMC Location Tables)
- offers rich content encoding
- is language independent
- facilitates client device filtering of service content
- is designed to support "thick" and "thin" client devices
- provides adaptation layers for different communication bearers

== TPEG2 applications ==
ISO Part No.	ISO Reference	Title	Acronym	Description
21219-1		Introduction, numbering and versions	INV	This Technical Specification provides an introduction and index to the complete set of TPEG Generation 2 toolkit components and applications. It allows the indexing of new applications as they are added to the TPEG applications family, by defining their Application Identification (AID).
21219-2		UML modelling rules	UMR	Rules to define the semantics of a TPEG application by a suitable model, independent from its physical data format and transmission issues. These rules ease TPEG implementation process.
21219-3		UML to binary conversion rules	UBCR	TPEG applications are modelled in UML to provide an application description that is independent of a physical format representation. By separating semantics from application description, applications can easily be developed at a functional level. Different physical format representations can be generated following a well defined set of rules on how to convert UML classes to different physical formats.
21219-4		UML to XML conversion rules	UXCR	Rules for converting TPEG application UML models to the tpegML format description.
21219-5		Service framework	SFW	TPEG2 can provide a multiplex of TPEG Services and applications. Both the binary and XML formats are specified to compose a multiplex of TPEG services, each potentially having multiple TPEG applications.
21219-6		Message management container	MMC	The Message Management Container is used by all TPEG applications to provide information about the handling of messages on the TPEG client side
21219-7		Location referencing container	LRC	The TPEG2-Location Referencing Container is used to signal which specific location referencing method is in use for a particular TPEG Message. It is able to handle Location Referencing methods that are external to the present ISO series and the internal location referencing methods defined as parts of this series.
21219-9		Service and network information	SNI	The TPEG-SNI application is designed to allow the efficient and language independent delivery of information about the availability of the same service on another bearer channel or similar service data from another service provider, directly from service provider to end-users. In all TPEG streams it is mandatory to deliver to so-called GST. Additionally it is possible to signal linkage of content between different bearers and services.
21219-10		Conditional access information	CAI	Function applied on service frame or service component level. Thanks to it, some service components may be encrypted using the same "encryption key", while other remain unencrypted or use different "encryption keys".
21219-11		Universal location referencing	ULR	The Universal Location Referencing (ULR) was designed to support use cases beyond automotive applications and offers a flexible method that supports human-understandable representations, like text, as well as machine-readable code for map-matching on digital maps. ULR contains geo-coordinates (WGS84) together with supplementary information (e.g. direction, height, level), while keeping the overall complexity of encoding/decoding limited.
21219-14		Parking information application	PKI	Designed to deliver parking information (textually, voiced or graphically) to a variety of receivers via digital broadcasting and Internet technologies.
21219-15		Traffic event compact application	TEC	Compact application for traffic event / incident information. TPEG2-TEC is optimized to support dynamic route guidance navigation devices. This application is currently in the phase of being rolled out by more and more providers to replace TMC
21219-16		Fuel price information application	FPI	This application has been designed to support information of fuel stations, their location, fuel types offered, and fuel pricing and availability information.
21219-18		Traffic flow and prediction application	TFP	Compact application providing precise travel speed / travel time and forecast information. Many premium dynamic navigation devices use this application as a basis to use current and expected traffic to be displayed to the user and for dynamic route calculation
21219-19		Weather information application	WEA	Weather forecast for travellers, over multiple time periods and geographical areas.
21219-20		Extended TMC location referencing	ETL	This application establishes additional fields for coding closed exit and entries. This is primarily aimed at devices which can only decode TEC with TMC-Location-Container. Furthermore, the possibility is added to "Extend" a TMC location to include the Internal road segments of the secondary location, and to exclude optionally the internal road segments of the primary location.
21219-21		Geographic location referencing	GLR	Method for signaling geographic location references (points, poly-lines, and geographical areas), which can be transported inside a TPEG-Location Referencing Container (TPEG-LRC) for those TPEG applications wishing to relay primarily geographical locations (e.g. Weather).
21219-22		OpenLR location referencing	OLR	Designed to transfer traffic information (e.g. current traffic situation at a certain point, special alerts) from a centre to in-vehicle systems, built-in or used as an add-on (PND, Smart Phone).
21219-23		Road and multimodal routes application	RMR	This application enables the provision of precise information and guidance from a central knowledge base to a traveller's mobile device. It encompasses road routes as well as multi-modal routes and parking.
21219-24		Light encryption	LTE	
21219-25		Electromobility charging infrastructure	EMI	

== TPEG services worldwide ==
=== Broadcast services ===
Country	Company	Status	Product/service	TPEG applications
Belgium	Be-Mobile	Live	Premium	TEC / TFP
Canada	Total Traffic + Weather Network	Live	Premium	TEC / TFP
Germany	HERE	Live	Premium	TEC / TFP
Germany	Mediamobile	Live	v-traffic	TEC / TFP
Italy	Infoblu	Live	Premium	TEC / TFP
Luxembourg	Be-Mobile	Live	Premium	TEC / TFP
Netherlands	Be-Mobile	Live	Premium	TEC / TFP
Norway	Mediamobile	Live	v-traffic	TEC / TFP
United Kingdom	INRIX	Live	Premium	TEC / TFP
United Kingdom	Trafficmaster	Live	Premium	TEC
United States	Total Traffic + Weather Network	Live	Premium	TEC / TFP
Trial services
France	Mediamobile	Trial (in some cities)	v-traffic	TEC / TFP
Germany	ARD (9 regional services)	Trial (live in some regions)	Free to Air	TEC / TFP / PKI (in some regions)
Poland	Mediamobile	Trial	v-traffic	TEC / TFP
Sweden	Mediamobile	Trial	v-traffic	TEC / TFP

=== Mobile broadband (IP based) services ===
Country	Company	Status	Product/service	TPEG applications
Andorra	TomTom	Live	Premium	TEC / TFP / WEA
Argentina	HERE	Live	Premium	TEC / TFP
Australia	HERE	Live	Premium	TEC / TFP
Australia	Tomtom	Live	Premium	TEC / TFP /WEA
Austria	HERE	Live	Premium	TEC / TFP
Austria	Tomtom	Live	Premium	TEC / TFP /WEA
Belgium	HERE	Live	Premium	TEC / TFP
Belgium	Tomtom	Live	Premium	TEC / TFP /WEA
Brazil	HERE	Live	Premium	TEC / TFP
Brazil	Tomtom	Live	Premium	TEC / TFP /WEA
Canada	HERE	Live	Premium	TEC / TFP
Canada	Tomtom	Live	Premium	TEC / TFP /WEA
Canada	Total Traffic + Weather Network	Live	Premium	TEC / TFP
Chile	Tomtom	Live	Premium	TEC / TFP /WEA
China	NavInfo	Live	Premium	TEC / TFP
China	Tomtom	Live	Premium	TEC / TFP /WEA
Czech Republic	HERE	Live	Premium	TEC / TFP
Czech Republic	Tomtom	Live	Premium	TEC / TFP /WEA
Croatia	HERE	Live	Premium	TEC / TFP
Denmark	HERE	Live	Premium	TEC / TFP
Denmark	Tomtom	Live	Premium	TEC / TFP /WEA
Finland	HERE	Live	Premium	TEC / TFP
Finland	Tomtom	Live	Premium	TEC / TFP /WEA
France	HERE	Live	Premium	TEC / TFP
France	Tomtom	Live	Premium	TEC / TFP /WEA
Germany	Tomtom	Live	Premium	TEC / TFP /WEA
Germany	HERE	Live	Premium	TEC / TFP
Germany	Inrix	Live	Premium	TEC / TFP
Gibraltar	Tomtom	Live	Premium	TEC / TFP /WEA
Greece	HERE	Live	Premium	TEC / TFP
Hungary	HERE	Live	Premium	TEC / TFP
India	HERE	Live	Premium	TEC / TFP
Indonesia	HERE	Live	Premium	TEC / TFP
Ireland	HERE	Live	Premium	TEC / TFP
Ireland	Tomtom	Live	Premium	TEC / TFP /WEA
Italy	HERE	Live	Premium	TEC / TFP
Italy	Tomtom	Live	Premium	TEC / TFP /WEA
Lesotho	Tomtom	Live	Premium	TEC / TFP /WEA
Liechtenstein	Tomtom	Live	Premium	TEC / TFP /WEA
Luxembourg	HERE	Live	Premium	TEC / TFP
Luxembourg	Tomtom	Live	Premium	TEC / TFP /WEA
Malaysia	HERE	Live	Premium	TEC / TFP
Malaysia	Tomtom	Live	Premium	TEC / TFP /WEA
Malta	Tomtom	Live	Premium	TEC / TFP /WEA
Mexico	HERE	Live	Premium	TEC / TFP
Mexico	Tomtom	Live	Premium	TEC / TFP /WEA
Monaco	Tomtom	Live	Premium	TEC / TFP /WEA
Netherlands	HERE	Live	Premium	TEC / TFP
Netherlands	Tomtom	Live	Premium	TEC / TFP /WEA
New Zealand	HERE	Live	Premium	TEC / TFP
New Zealand	Tomtom	Live	Premium	TEC / TFP /WEA
Norway	HERE	Live	Premium	TEC / TFP
Norway	Tomtom	Live	Premium	TEC / TFP /WEA
Poland	HERE	Live	Premium	TEC / TFP
Poland	Tomtom	Live	Premium	TEC / TFP /WEA
Portugal	HERE	Live	Premium	TEC / TFP
Portugal	Tomtom	Live	Premium	TEC / TFP /WEA
Puerto Rico	HERE	Live	Premium	TEC / TFP
Russia	HERE	Live	Premium	TEC / TFP
Russia	Tomtom	Live	Premium	TEC / TFP /WEA
San Marino	Tomtom	Live	Premium	TEC / TFP /WEA
Saudi Arabia	HERE	Live	Premium	TEC / TFP
Saudi Arabia	Tomtom	Live	Premium	TEC / TFP /WEA
Singapore	HERE	Live	Premium	TEC / TFP
Singapore	Tomtom	Live	Premium	TEC / TFP /WEA
Slovakia	HERE	Live	Premium	TEC / TFP
Slovenia	HERE	Live	Premium	TEC / TFP
South Africa	HERE	Live	Premium	TEC / TFP
South Africa	Tomtom	Live	Premium	TEC / TFP /WEA
South Korea	HERE	Live	Premium	TEC / TFP
South Korea	MBC dmb Drive	Live	Premium	TEC / TFP / WEA
Spain	HERE	Live	Premium	TEC / TFP
Spain	Tomtom	Live	Premium	TEC / TFP /WEA
Sweden	HERE	Live	Premium	TEC / TFP
Sweden	Tomtom	Live	Premium	TEC / TFP /WEA
Switzerland	HERE	Live	Premium	TEC / TFP
Switzerland	Tomtom	Live	Premium	TEC / TFP /WEA
Taiwan	HERE	Live	Premium	TEC / TFP
Taiwan	Tomtom	Live	Premium	TEC / TFP /WEA
Thailand	HERE	Live	Premium	TEC / TFP
Thailand	Tomtom	Live	Premium	TEC / TFP /WEA
Turkey	HERE	Live	Premium	TEC / TFP
Turkey	Tomtom	Live	Premium	TEC / TFP /WEA
Ukraine	HERE	Live	Premium	TEC / TFP
United Arab Emirates	HERE	Live	Premium	TEC / TFP
United Arab Emirates	Tomtom	Live	Premium	TEC / TFP /WEA
United Kingdom	HERE	Live	Premium	TEC / TFP
United Kingdom	Tomtom	Live	Premium	TEC / TFP /WEA
United States	HERE	Live	Premium	TEC / TFP
United States	Tomtom	Live	Premium	TEC / TFP /WEA
United States	Total Traffic + Weather Network	Live	Premium	TEC / TFP
Vatican City	Tomtom	Live	Premium	TEC / TFP /WEA

=== Hybrid services ===
Country	Company	Status	Product	TPEG applications
United States	Total Traffic and Weather Network	Live	TTN HD-Hybrid	TEC / TFP / FPI

== See also ==
- Transport standards organisations
- Traveller Information Services Association (TISA)
