= Hyderabad Road Development Corporation Limited =

Agency overview
- Formed: 12 June 2017; 9 years ago
- Preceding agencies: Roads & Buildings; GHMC
- Jurisdiction: GHMC

The Hyderabad Road Development Corporation Limited (HRDCL) is a public roads authority established by Government of Telangana for building and managing roads in Hyderabad, Telangana. The authority will improve 240 km road length during phase I and remaining will be handed over in phased manner.

== History ==
The authority was created as special purpose vehicle (SPV) with the GO No 106 dated 11 March 2017 and started on 12 June 2017 with chief secretary as chairman and municipal administration secretary as managing director of the corporation. The roads belonging to R&B, department were transferred to the authority. It was created for raising capital to build and maintain growing road network.

== Organization ==
The authority has road network that is under greater Hyderabad and surrounding urban local bodies. By November 2022, HRDCL has successfully developed 21 link roads spanning a length of 24 km across the city of Hyderabad.

R&B has 600 km road network under its purview in Hyderabad, of which 240 km was transferred to HRDCL in Phase I, before the entire network comes to the authority.
