= Gregory's (food company) =

Coffee and Food Company

- Type: Public
- Industry: Food and Beverage Services
- Founded: 1972
- Founder: Grigoris Georgatos
- Headquarters: 8 Archaíou Theátrou Street, Alimos, Greece
- Number of locations: 371 (2026)
- Area served: Greece, Cyprus, Germany, Romania
- Key people: Vlassis Georgatos (CEO); Grigoris Georgatos Founder
- Products: Coffee, Drinks, Juices, Pies, Salads, Sandwiches, Yogurt bowls, Coffee accessories, Environmentally-friendly accessories, Packaged Products
- Revenue: €58.956.173(2025)
- Number of employees: 2.300 (2026)
- Website: https://www.gregorys.gr/en/

Gregory's (legally Gregory's S.A.) is a Greek coffee and food service company founded in 1972, operating 370 stores in Greece, Cyprus, Germany, and Romania. The company expands its network through the franchise model and is one of the largest chains in the sector in the Greek market. In the European ranking, it holds the 12th place among the largest coffee chains. The product range of its stores includes coffee, beverages, pies, sandwiches, salads, sweets, and packaged foods.

== History ==
The company was named after its founder, Grigoris Georgatos, who opened the first Gregory's store in Athens in 1972. The store sold traditional Greek pastries such as cheese pie (tyropita), sausage pie (loukanikopita), ham and cheese pie (zambonotyropita), as well as loukoumades and ice cream.

In the 1990s, Vlassis Georgatos took over the management of the company and led Gregory's into a period of rapid growth, setting franchising as a strategic priority.

== Company Milestones ==
- 1972: Opening of the first Gregory’s store.
- 1994: Launch of the Gregory’s franchise system.
- 2001: Strategic presence in airports, with the first two stores at Athens International Airport.
- 2005: Entry into the Cypriot market.
- 2015: Expansion into the German market.
- 2016: Rebranding and introduction of a new logo.
- 2017: Launch of mobile app and web application for online orders.
- 2018: Entry into the Romanian market.
- 2019: Strengthening of the wellbeing product category with new menu offerings.
- 2021: Introduction of a new store image.
- 2022: Celebration of 50 years of operation.
- 2024: Launch of a new store concept: Kantina.
- 2025: New e-order for online orders.
- 2026: New Rewards Program " Smiling Club"

== Stores ==
Gregory’s operates 370 stores across four European countries.( as of 2026).

| 350 | Greece | |
| 14 | Cyprus | Cyprus with Brighter Colors |
| 4 | Romania | |
| 2 | Germany | |

== Retail formats ==
High street shop: Located on central commercial streets with high pedestrian traffic.

Kantina (canteen): A small shop operating in outdoor spaces, aimed at quick service for customers on the go.

== Corporate Social Responsibility ==
Gregory’s has developed corporate social responsibility (CSR) initiatives focusing on people, society, and the environment. These initiatives include support for vulnerable social groups, employee empowerment, and practices aimed at reducing the company’s environmental footprint.

- The company offers as a social product the “Gregory’s – School Synergy Snacks” bar, packaged by young people with disabilities and distributed exclusively through its store network. The initiative is carried out in cooperation with School Synergy Snacks, a Social Cooperative Enterprise for the integration of vulnerable social groups, with the goal of promoting social and professional inclusion.
- It has been a member of the "Alliance for the Reduction of Food Waste" since its establishment, with the aim of reducing food waste.
- The company collaborates with SOS Children’s Villages to provide support programs for children in need.
- Each year, the company donates surplus food portions to the non-profit organization Boroume. In 2025, it contributed 26.902 meals.
- It collaborates with the association "Together for Children", providing in 2024 a total of 25,565 meals to 1,897 children.
- It promotes the reduction of single-use plastics by offering a range of reusable containers, such as water and beverage thermoses, and by providing incentives for their reuse by customers.
- It collaborates with Myrtillo Café, with the aim of promoting the employment inclusion of socially vulnerable groups and people with disabilities.
