= Fleet controlling =

Fleet controlling is a type of telematic system for wagon-vehicles and mobile equipment used for back-office management. It represents the evolution from simple vehicle tracking to a more comprehensive system focused on business intelligence and operational control.

Depending on the supplier, these systems can provide several functions:

- Collecting and sending operating data, such as vehicle location data, activity logs, and driver performance metrics.
- Logging data from a telematic control unit installed in a vehicle or machinery, including planned routes, assigned tasks, and text messages.
- Sending commands and information from a central operations center, such as alert messages, reports, route planning, and task optimization.
- Integrating with GPS tracking units.

Because they process and exchange location-specific data, these systems are classified as a type of location-based service (LBS).

== Platform contribution ==
Fleet controlling systems expand upon the capabilities of earlier fleet management platforms by integrating a wider range of vehicle data to provide deeper business insights. Common features include:

- Two-way text communication between a data center and the vehicle or machinery.
- Integration with route, personnel, and schedule management (Hours of Service).
- Reading data from a vehicle's CAN bus or Fleet Management System (FMS) interface.
- An alert system for emergency events, such as geofencing breaches, sudden changes in fuel consumption, or delays.
- The ability to connect with third-party systems, including fuel level sensors and other devices.

Telematic systems transfer data via GPRS or satellite, and vehicle location is determined by GPS.

== Development ==
The concept of a fleet controlling platform was first presented in 2007 at the Transport Logistic exhibition in Munich, Germany. The system evolved from earlier fleet management systems by incorporating newer hardware and enabling closer integration with third-party information systems.
