= Highway authority in the United States =

Highway authority in the United States includes a planning process of different forms of transportation and governmental funding given. Transportation in the United States creates mobility and access to different resources within cities. Some forms of transportation in the United States includes trolleys, metros, ferries, bus routes, highways, bicycling, trams and walking. All these forms are not used in every city. Each city based on the development and planning process of transportation decides what form of transportation fits best. One important factor in the planning process of transportation is the government interference such as funding, policies and regulations. The department of transportation (DOT) plays an important role in the process of developing transportation in different cities.

Although the government funds specific transportation project and decides the safety as well as regulations in the planning, community members have the right to voice their opinion on the construction of specific transportation methods in a city (different geographical locations). Community members can come together in council meetings to speak on their inputs of constructing a transportation in a city that can possibly affect those living around the transportation routes. This becomes another important factor in transportation that demonstrates how community members are and should be included in the planning process of transportation. Another important factor to consider is how many transportation plans impact not only cities environmental stability but other linkages.

== Historical development ==
The growing transportation systems in the United States did not develop just through historical transportation uses such as horses and wagons. The exploration experiences of the Spanish, British, and French settlers as they sailed through the ocean reaching land became an opportunity to develop possible transportation systems. In addition to this, the takeover of land lead to possible transportation routes as a resources for economic projects . Some possible transportation systems were train routes, the creation of the Model T automobile and interurban trolley service (1800s & 1900s). As technology continued to develop this also affected the way specific transportation systems were created which can possibly continue to change.

== United States Department of Transportation ==
The United States Department of Transportation (USDOT) plays an important role in transportation planning as a support system for both citizens and transportation programs such as Federal Highway Administration programs, Historic Covered Bridge program, and Safe Routes to School program. [2] This transportation agency also administrators different policies by making sure programs are following the restrictions and safe regulations within the transportation Acts. One of these is the Intermodal Surface Transportation Efficiency Act (ISTEA) passed in 1991 that looks closer to the safety and improvement of transportation forms for community members, transits, and bicycle facilities. The most important role the U.S. Department of Transportation has is offering community members transportation information specifically in roads and highways.

== Walking and bicycling ==
Walking and bicycling are two transportation methods that play an important part of social capital within a community. Advocating and including land space for these two methods of transportation can lead community members to go on walks and jogs which can also lead to meeting other members within the city. It is important to consider how much land space within the planning process of transportation is going to be give for citizens to have the choice to walk or bike to specific areas. There are three forms of incorporating these methods of transportation in the development of a city. These forms are known as class one, class two, and class three routes. Class one focuses on the roadway paths that keep cars in separate lanes and that this lanes run separately from bike lanes. Class two focuses on pathways that include not only separate lanes for bikes but also concrete that gives citizens the opportunity to walk. Incorporating this concrete pathway does along more than one walk way but for bike lanes it is limited to one way. Lastly, class number three route is a pathway that shares the routes going to be planned. This includes bike lane on the same side of the street going in both direction within their individual bike lanes and concrete for walking.

== Environmental factors in transportation ==
Different transportation systems affect the environment of a city but can also affect other elements. Transportation system planning impact three main elements that can go back and forth. These three elements are accessibility, land use, and activity. The planning process of transportation system can impact all, none, or one of these three elements. Therefore, during the process of planning it is important to consider what will be at stake if specific transportation systems are going to be built. In addition to these elements, transportation also impacts the environment around it. The increase of car use in specific cities within the United States has increased which can cause more pollution in the air due to leaded gas for fuel engines. Another important impact is that transportation systems can impact the national economy. This can be due to the large investments in specific transportation system development in cities such as bridges and construction of roads.
