= Denso Ten =

Japanese automotive parts manufacturer company

Denso Ten Limited
- Native name: 株式会社デンソーテン
- Company type: Subsidiary
- Industry: Automotive; Electronics
- Founded: 25 October 1972 (as Fujitsu Ten)
- Headquarters: Kobe, Japan
- Key people: Keijiro Katsumaru (Chairman); Satoshi Iwata (President)
- Products: Automotive electronics, home audio equipment, mobile communication radios
- Number of employees: 3,836 (consolidated: 11,410) (end March 2012)
- Parent: Denso (51%); Toyota (35%); Fujitsu (14%)
- Website: www.denso-ten.com

Denso Ten Limited (株式会社デンソーテン, Kabushiki-gaisha Denso Ten) is a Japanese company developing and manufacturing car audio, video, navigation and control systems. The headquarters is located in Kobe, Hyōgo Prefecture, Japan. As its name shows, Denso Ten belongs to the Denso group led by Denso Corp., which is the second-largest auto parts supplier in the world.

Originally the company was established as Fujitsu Ten Ltd. (富士通テン株式会社, Fujitsu Ten Kabushiki-gaisha), a subsidiary company of Denso Ltd. which is one of the leading electronics companies in Japan. The parent company was changed from Fujitsu to Denso on November 1, 2017.

The major products of Denso Ten are the Eclipse brand car audio and navigation systems. It is also a supplier of OEM products to major automobile companies in Japan and the U.S.

DENSO TEN AMERICA Limited, the U.S. headquarters, is located in Novi, Michigan is a subsidiary of Denso Ten that supplies products to the U.S. market and industry.

== History ==
Fujitsu Ten was created in 1972 when it was spun out by Fujitsu. It took with it the automotive and radio electronics departments. The intention was that creating a separate company would give more focus to these areas. The automotive and radio departments were themselves the result of a merger between Fujitsu Limited and Kobe Industries Corp. in 1968. In 1974, Toyota invested in the company.

In September 2016, Denso agreed with Fujitsu to purchase the stock of Fujitsu Ten. The deal was made on November 1, 2017, and its name was changed to Denso Ten. This resulted in Denso increasing its share from 10% to 51%, Fujitsu reducing from 55% to 14% and Toyota remaining at 35%.

== Brands ==
Eclipse is a brand name for its GPS car navigation and audio system products, including some with Traffic Message Channel.

Some car radios were branded as Tenvox during the 1980s.

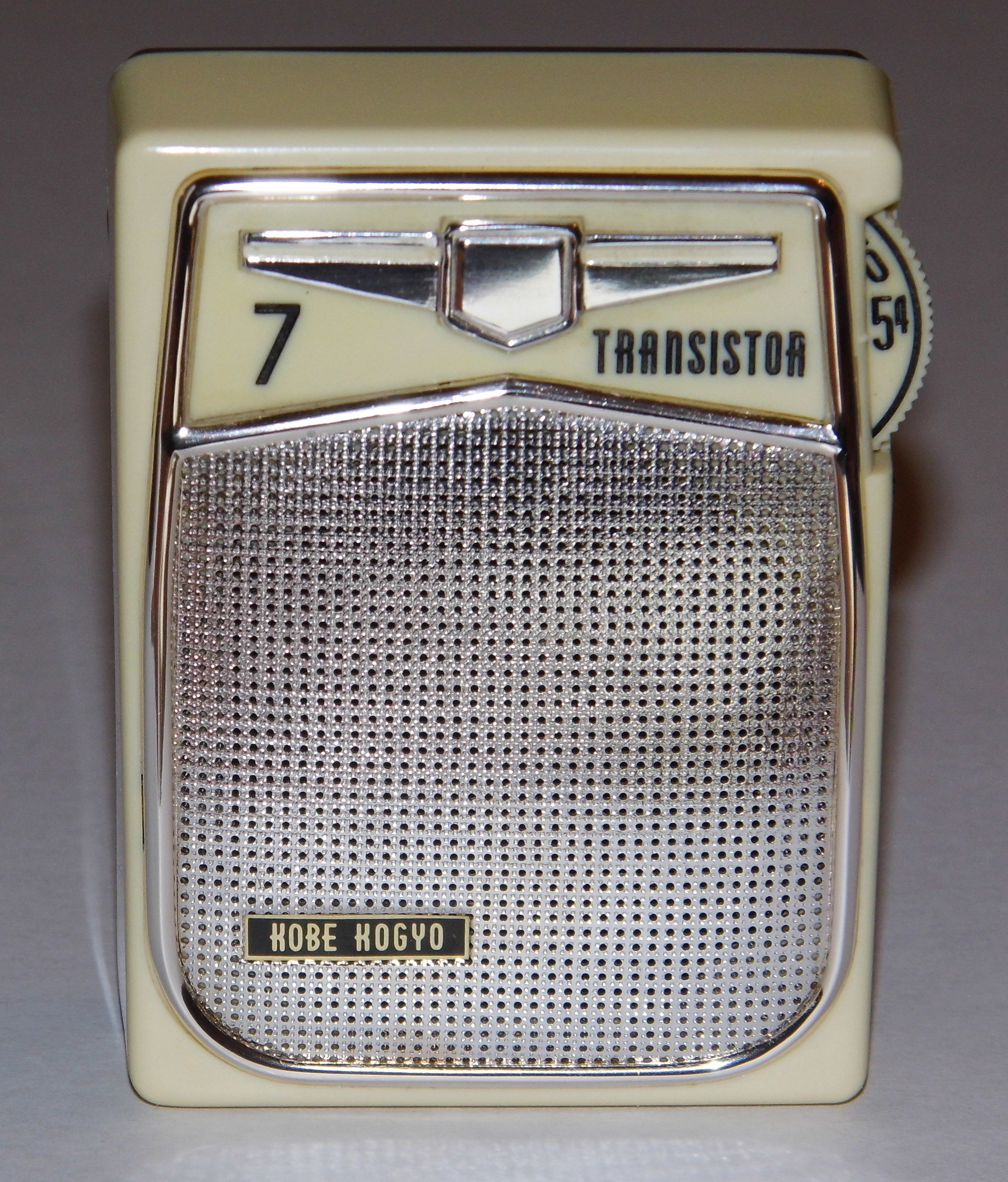
Kobe Industrial Radio

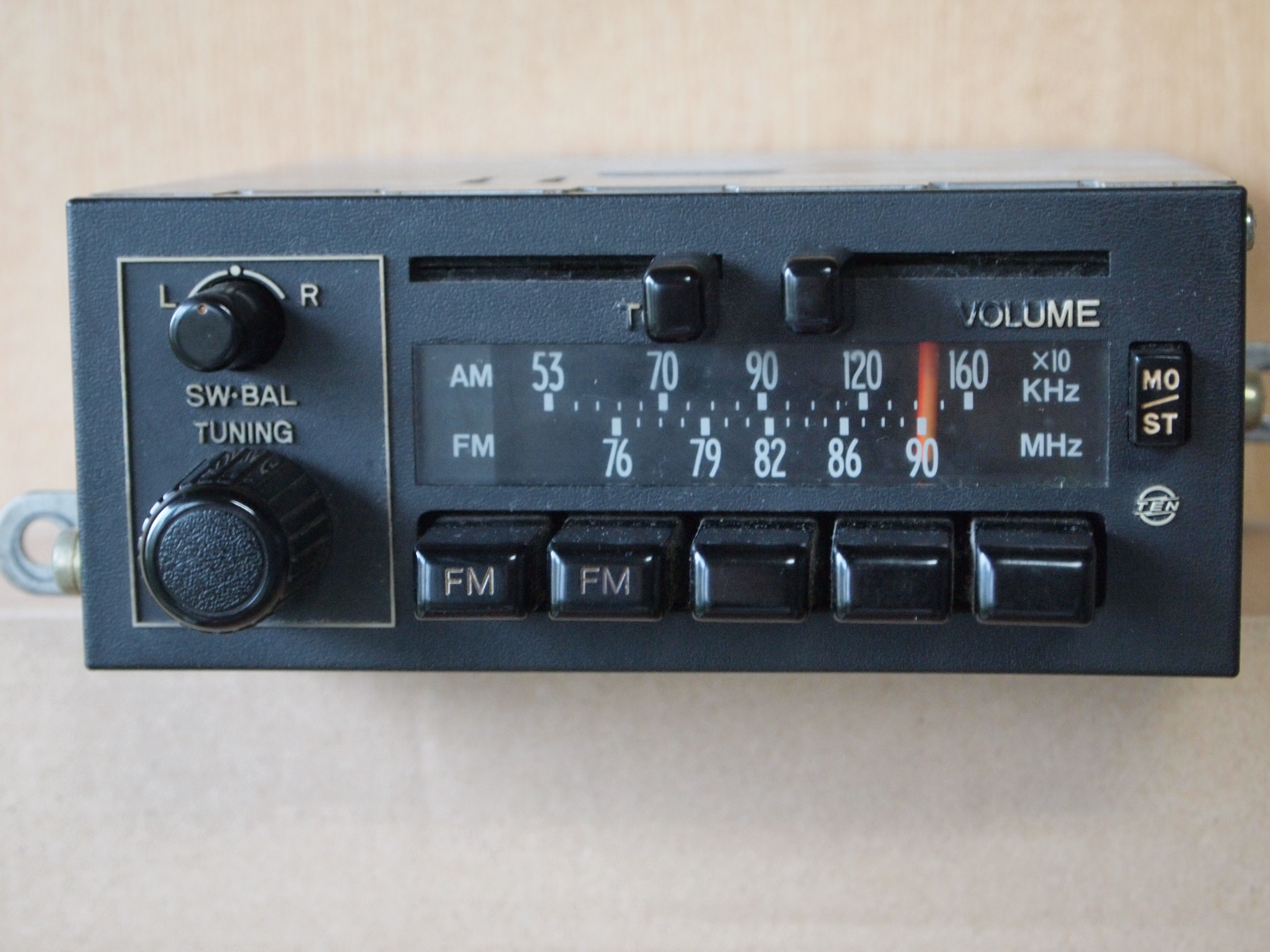
TEN brand car radio
