= Road Transport Authority (Myanmar) =

Government agency of Myanmar

The Road Transport Authority of Myanmar is part of that country's Ministry of Rail Transportation. It was founded in 1959 as the Naypyidaw Transport Company. In 1962, it became Burma Economic Development Corporation (BEDC). In 1963 it changed to Road Transport Group. In 1972 it changed its name to Road Transport Corporation, and in 1989 it became Road Transport Authority under the Ministry of Rail Transportation.

== Passenger fees ==
- Yangon to/from Taungoo: K5300
- Yangon to/from Meiktila: K6400
- Yangon to/from Naypyidaw: K3500
- Yangon to/from Nyaung U: K7000
- Yangon to/from Yaynang Chaung: K2250 / K6300
- Yangon to/from Myin Chan: K5800
- Yangon to/from Monywa: K8000
- Mandalay to/from Na Bu Aing: K1000
- Mawlamyine to/from Kyaikkami: K800
- Mawlamyine to/from Thanpyuzayat: K650

== Ordinary Goods Transport ==
- K55 to K330+

== Fleet ==
- Daewoo Bus
- Dongfeng Bus
- Ankai Bus
- Mercedes-Benz Bus
- Hino Truck
- HOWO Truck
- Shacman Truck
