= Universal Publishers (Australia) =

Australian publisher

- Industry: Map-making
- Headquarters: Sydney, Australia
- Key people: Astrid Browne (Managing Director)
- Products: UBD-Gregory's Street Directories and maps

Universal Publishers produce the ubiquitous UBD-Gregory's street directories in Australia. The names of these publications have come to be used as a generic term for street directories in many Australian cities.

== Company profile ==
Universal publishes street directories, guides, maps and road atlases and is Australia's largest mapping and travel-related products publisher. The company distributes travel, language, and cartographic ranges for Berlitz, Insight Guides, Michelin and Marco Polo.

== Products ==
- Australian capital city street directories
- State street directories for each state and territory
- 'CityLink' directories containing Brisbane, Melbourne or Sydney street directories and surrounding regional areas
- 'Compact' street directories for capital cities and 'mini' street directories for eastern states capital cities
- Regional street directories for each state containing town maps and a road atlas. The Northern Territory town maps and road atlas are integrated into the South Australia directory
- A variety of fold-out maps covering capital cities, regional areas and entire states
- DVD versions of the capital/regional city street directories and regional Cities and Towns directories
- Road atlases covering the whole of Australia

The above products were branded UBD prior to the 2012 editions when production of standalone Gregory's street directories ceased in favour of cobranded UBD-Gregory's directories retaining the UBD format, UBD-Gregory's Darwin 2013, 4th edition. The last standalone Gregory's directory was the commemorative 75th Edition Sydney street directory, published in 2011.

2018 directories showed as being issued by UBD as a subsidiary to Hardie Grant Travel while 2019 directories show as being issued by Hardie Grant Travel with no mention of UBD although the Hardie Grant website shows the publisher as UBD Gregory's.

== Comprehensive directories ==
While primarily street directories, UBD and Gregory's also contain details on public transport (train and light rail, tickets and prices), bicycle paths, suburb and postcode details, public parks and reserves, landmarks (such as commercial buildings, telephone boxes, pubs and restaurants), attractions, and also boat mooring details in recognised docks. They also contain maps of university campuses and crematoria. Prior to the UBD-Gregory's merger the UBD Compact street directories also contained a 'Cityside guide' with tourist information.

== Cartography ==
The rendering of roads in most city and town maps uses the traditional drawing of two lines with the road name printed in between, (known as 'double casing'). In the UBD Melbourne directory maps show a single line with the name above or below the road to make it more appealing to people familiar with the Melway street directory, however older Melbourne UBD maps, such as those from the 1980s or earlier, used the double casing method. This mapping style is also used for road atlas maps and main road maps.

UBD products are notorious for continuing to contain copyright traps: fictitious streets or buildings or other features, included for purposes of identifying competitor's products that have copied UBD's data without fieldchecking it. For this reason, UBD's and Gregory's products cannot be relied on completely for historical research. An example of a copyright trap is the 'boomerang factory' that appeared for many years on the UBD map of Canberra, in the industrial suburb of Fyshwick, on the corner of Newcastle and Barrier streets, which location was in fact an exgovernment furniture depot. In other cases short dead-end streets or laneways (with or without names), or long-forgotten proposed roads, may appear.
