= Gary Burrell =

American electrical engineer, businessman, and philanthropist

- Born: Gary Leon Burrell; August 24, 1937; Stilwell, Kansas, U.S.
- Died: June 12, 2019 (aged 81); Spring Hill, Kansas, U.S.
- Education: Wichita State University (BS); Rensselaer Polytechnic Institute (MS)
- Occupations: electrical engineer and entrepreneur
- Known for: co-founder of the Garmin GPS company

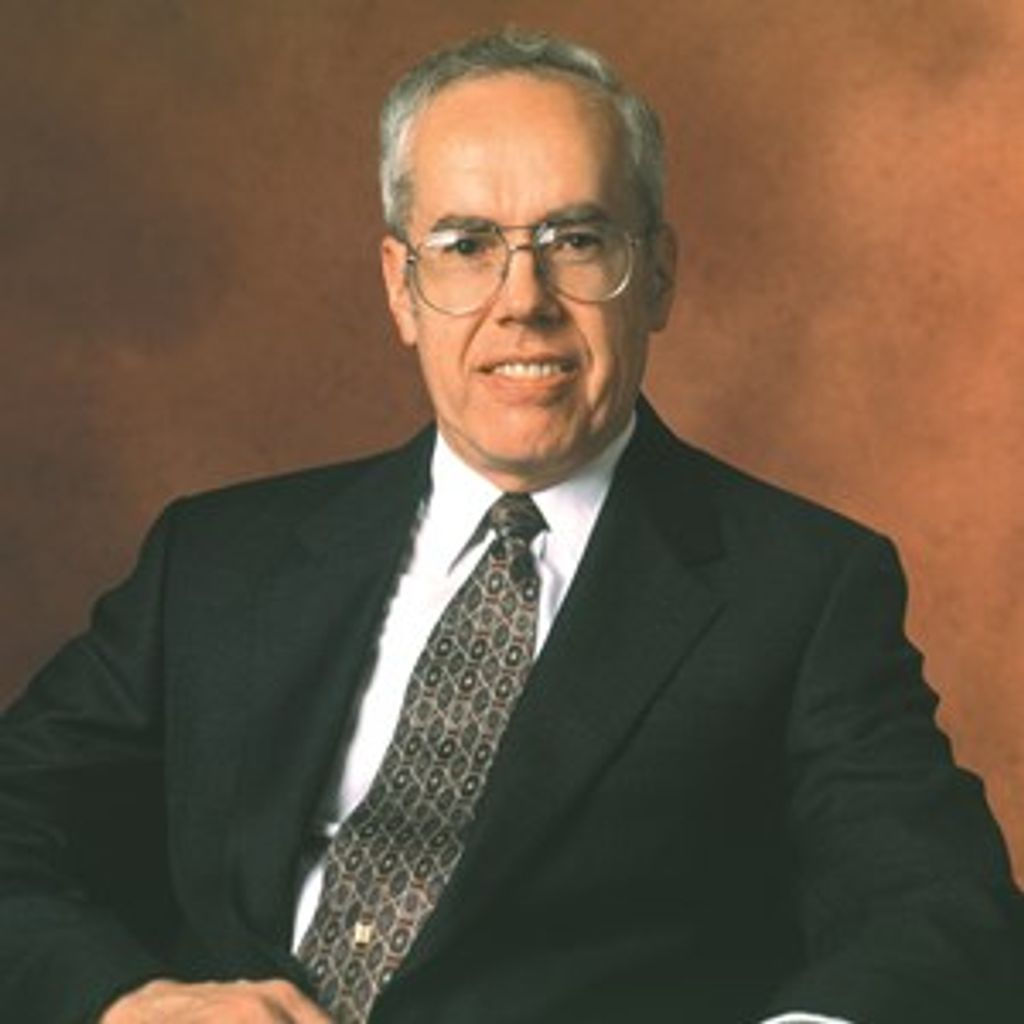

Gary Leon Burrell (August 24, 1937 – June 12, 2019) was an American electrical engineer, businessman, and philanthropist. He was the co-founder, with Min Kao, and chairman emeritus of Garmin, makers of popular Global Positioning System devices.

== Early life ==
Gary Burrell was born in 1937. He earned his undergraduate degree in electrical engineering from Wichita State University and a master's degree from Rensselaer Polytechnic Institute.

== Career ==
Burrell worked for Lowrance Electronics and King Radio Corporation. In the early 1980s, he worked for Allied Signal.

Along with partner Min Kao, Burrell founded Garmin in 1989 to make navigation devices for aviation and boating using the Global Positioning System. Their original office was two folding chairs and a card table. Some U.S. servicemen used Garmin GPS during the first Gulf War, even though Garmin never had a military contract. Later on, the technology was expanded for the U.S. market, providing directions across all United States roads and highways.

== Philanthropy ==
Burrell was a significant donor to the Indian Creek Community Church in Olathe, Kansas.

== Awards ==
In September 2024, Burrell was inducted into the National Aviation Hall of Fame in Dayton, Ohio.

== Personal life ==
Burrell was married and had three children. He resided in Spring Hill, Kansas. As of 2016, Burrell was a billionaire. He died on June 12, 2019 at the age of 81 from complications of Parkinson's disease.
