= Ken Kao =

American film producer

Ken Kao is an American film producer. He is known for his work with Terrence Malick, and for co-founding Arcana with Ryan Gosling. Kao is the President and Founder of Waypoint Entertainment.

== Early life ==
Kao was born in the late 1970s and is the son of billionaire GPS pioneer Min Kao. He grew up in Kansas City. His younger sister is fashion designer Jen Kao.

== Personal life ==
Kao married Jessica Michibata in 2016, and they gave birth to one child in 2017. The family live in Los Angeles.

== Films ==
- Rampart
- Knight of Cups
- The Sea of Trees
- The Nice Guys
- Silence
- Lost in London
- Song to Song
- The Glass Castle
- Hostiles
- Woodshock
- The Outside
- Tau
- The Favourite
- Mid90s
- Cuckoo
- Longlegs
- Hamlet
- She Rides Shotgun
- Splitsville
- Project Hail Mary
- The Actor
- I Love Boosters
- Hokum
