= GRMN =

GRMN may refer to:

- Garmin (stock ticker symbol GRMN), an American technology company
- Toyota GRMN, line-up of performance vehicles developed by Toyota Gazoo Racing
