= King Radio (disambiguation) =

King Radio may refer to:

- King Radio, a calypsonian musician
- King Radio (company)
- KING Radio, a short-lived predecessor to Radio 390

== See also ==
- The Radio King
