= Freenex =

Korean company

Freenex Co, Ltd.
- Company type: Public
- Industry: Auto parts, Electronics
- Founded: 2002
- Headquarters: South Korea, Seoul
- Key people: Lee Woo Yeol (CEO)
- Products: Global Positioning System, Navigation
- Website: http://www.freenex.co.kr (Korean)

Freenex Co, Ltd. (Korean: 프리넥스) is a Korean company that supplies navigation systems for electronics and automotive applications. It is headquartered in Gil-dong Gangdong-gu Seoul, Korea, established in 2002. Freenex companies develop consumer and aviation technologies employing the Global Positioning System. Freenex also creates OEM products for BMW, Hyundai Autonet, WIA brand navigation automotive markets and for Vitas.

Products include television, navigated teletext, digital maps and navigation. Its primary competitor in Hyundai Autonet and Garmin. Freenex CEO is Lee Woo Yeol (이우열).

== Products ==
- L-Vision model:520
- H-Vision model:2200, 700
- D-Vision model:700, 750, 720G
- DM-720CL
- DXM-760
- DMB-100

== Major competitors ==
- Hyundai Autonet
- Thinkway
- Exroad
- Garmin

== See also ==
- Automotive navigation system
