= Garmin Forerunner =

Sport watches produced by Garmin

Forerunner
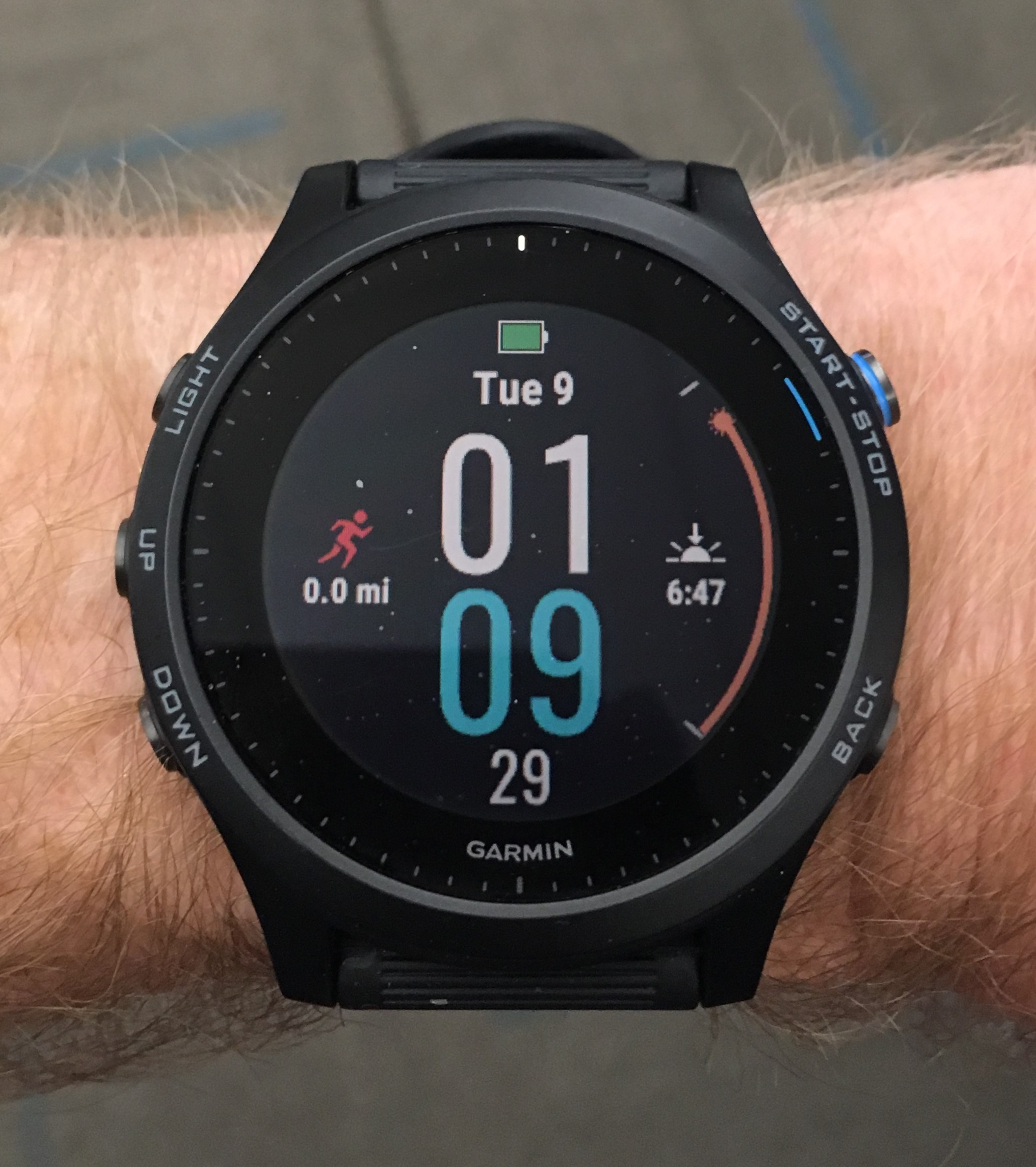
- Garmin Forerunner 945
- Manufacturer: Garmin
- Display: Digital
- Introduced: March 2, 2003; 23 years ago

The Garmin Forerunner series is a selection of sports watches produced by Garmin. Most models use the Global Positioning System (GPS), and are targeted at road runners and triathletes. Forerunner series watches are designed to measure distance, speed, heart rate (optional), time, altitude, steps, and pace.

== Models ==
The Forerunner series consists of models (listed in chronological order by release date):

- 101
- 201
- 301
- 205
- 305
- 50
- 405
- 60
- 405CX
- 310XT
- 110
- 210
- 410
- 610
- 910XT
- 70
- 10
- 220
- 620
- 15
- 920XT
- 225
- 25
- 230
- 235
- 630
- 735XT
- 35
- 935
- 30
- 645
- 645 Music
- 45
- 45S
- 245
- 245 Music
- 945
- 745
- 55
- 945 LTE
- 255
- 255 Music
- 955
- 955 Solar
- 265
- 965
- 158
- 165
- 570
- 970
- 70
- 170

All models of the Forerunner series except the 101 include a way to upload training data to a personal computer and training software.

Garmin registered the name "Forerunner" with the United States Patent and Trademark Office in August 2001 but released the first watches—the 101, 201, and 301—in 2003. In 2006, the 205 and 305 launched. These models are smaller than the first generation and feature a more sensitive SiRFstarIII GPS receiver chip. In late 2007, the Forerunner 50 was introduced. Instead of GPS, this model was paired with a foot pod to measure displacement. The Forerunner 50 came with a USB stick that allowed training data to be transferred wirelessly to a computer. This feature has since become a staple of Garmin's more full-featured sport watches.

The Forerunner 405 was introduced in 2008 and was significantly smaller than its predecessors, marginally out-sizing a typical wristwatch. The 405 also featured improved satellite acquisition and connection. In 2009, Garmin introduced three new models: the Forerunner 60 (an evolution of the Forerunner 50), the Forerunner 405CX (405 chassis), and the Forerunner 310XT (an evolution of the 305 chassis). New features in these models included increased battery life and vibration alerts on the 310XT, and advanced calorie consumption modeling across all models. The new calorie consumption modeling in these devices was the result of Garmin's first collaboration with Finnish physiological analytics firm Firstbeat. The 310XT was also the first watch of the Forerunner series to be waterproof, allowing its use for swimming and all legs of a triathlon, fueled by an extended battery life. In 2010, a firmware update added vastly improved open-water swimming metrics.

In 2010, the Forerunner 110, 210 and 410 were introduced. The releases included the addition of a touch-sensitive bezel on the 410, presumably, allowing for easier scrolling and selection of functions. It was touted as providing "unmatched reliability in sweaty, rainy conditions." The Forerunner 610 was released in the spring of 2011 and featured a touch-sensitive screen as well as vibration alerts. In 2012, the Forerunner 910XT was introduced, an updated version of the 310XT. It was originally supposed to be released in Q4 of 2011, but was eventually released in Q1 of 2012. New features introduced in this model included the Sifter IV chipset, a barometric altimeter, and improved swimming metrics using an accelerometer in the watch. This allowed it to automatically count pool lengths and to recognize swimming styles. A further addition to the series was the Forerunner 10, a simple watch offering just GPS tracking of activities and run metrics like distance, pace and calories burned.

At the end of 2013 the Forerunner 220 and 620 were introduced, with colour screens, Bluetooth Low Energy (BLE; allowing connections to some smartphones), and, for the 620 only, a touchscreen, Wi-Fi (allowing automatic activity download) and enhanced "running dynamics" given by an updated heart rate monitor. These watches also abandoned syncing via the ANT+ protocol in favour of wired (USB) and Wi-Fi (620 only) data transfers. They were also waterproof but did not include any kind of swimming mode.

In 2014, the Forerunner 15 and 920XT were introduced. The 15 was the updated version of the 10, adding activity tracking, increased battery life, footpad and heart rate monitor capability. The 920XT was the successor of the 910XT, featuring all the capabilities of it (except ANT+ scale and fitness equipment capability) and adding features found in the 620 such as a colour screen, Wi-Fi data transfers and running dynamics. Additionally, battery life over the 910XT was improved, daily activity tracking, GLONASS support and a swim drill mode. The 920XT is the first Garmin watch extensible with custom apps built using the Garmin Connect IQ software development kit. In May 2015, the Forerunner 225 was the first Garmin watch with an integrated optical heart rate monitor. In May 2016, the Forerunner 735XT was a triathlon-focused Garmin watch with an integrated optical heart rate monitor.

In April 2017, Garmin announced the Forerunner 935, describing it as a running and triathlon watch, with features similar to the Fenix 5. The watch included 24/7 wrist-based heart rate monitoring and advanced training features. On March 12, 2018, Garmin released the Forerunner 645 and 645 Music, which were marketed as a high-end running watches. The models added Garmin Pay, a NFC-enabled touchless pay system, and the 645 Music was Garmin's first watch with onboard music storage (4 GB). The Forerunner 45 and 45S were released on April 30, 2019, as entry-level running watches. The 45S has a smaller bezel (39mm) than the 45 (42mm); there are no other differences. The device includes a 3rd generation optical heart rate monitor, which includes stress detection and Body Battery energy, along with earlier-generation OHR metrics. Bluetooth-connected features include audio prompts, LiveTrack, and smart notifications. Activity profiles include outdoor running, treadmill, walk, bike, and cardio, with the ability to configure more through Garmin Connect. The Forerunner 45 has built-in incident detection and assistance, which notifies a predesignated contact if a crash or fall is detected and provides a live tracking link for the watch's location. The Forerunner 245 and 245 Music, released on April 30, 2019, are midrange running watches. The 245 has all of the same capabilities as the 245 Music; however, the 245 Music allows you to store and play up to 500 songs directly on the watch or stream music from services such as Spotify or Deezer via wireless Bluetooth earphones. The 245 has Garmin Elevate with a 3rd generation optical heart rate monitor which features Pulse Ox, stress detection, Body Battery, along with earlier-generation OHR metrics. Also, a new feature included a detailed Activity summary screen, improved Race Predictor, and Training Status. The Forerunner 945, released on April 30, 2019, is a triathlon-focused, feature-rich watch. The 945 allows the ability to store and play up to 1000 songs directly on the watch or stream music through services such as Spotify or Deezer, via wireless Bluetooth earphones. The 945 includes all of the capabilities of its 935 predecessor and all of the features of the Forerunner 245. Other new features of the 945 are heat and altitude acclimation, training load balance, mapping with Trendline popularity routing, respiration rate, Around me mode, Climber future elevation plot, cartography support and topographical maps, XERO location, and preloaded with 41,000 golf courses.

The Forerunner 955, released April 30, 2022, improves upon the Forerunner 945 and includes a touch screen. The Forerunner 955 Solar has a solar charging ring in the display to extend battery life. Both 955 models charge via Garmin's proprietary charging port and a USB-A connector. In March 2023, Garmin announced the Forerunner 265, 265S and Forerunner 965. Both models are very similar to their predecessors, but included AMOLED displays for the first time. Garmin released the Garmin Forerunner 158 which is only available in China. In May 2025, Garmin announced the Forerunner 570 and Forerunner 970. These watches include a built-in speaker and microphone for phone calls, as well as an LED flash-light. They are equipped with the Garmin Elevate V5 optical heart rate sensor. In May 2026, Garmin released Forerunner 70 and Forerunner 170, with a 1.2 inch AMOLED display and touchscreen.

== Features ==
=== GPS functionality ===
The Forerunner can be used to record historical data by completing a workout and then uploading the data to a computer to create a log of previous exercise activities for analysis.

Additionally, the Forerunner can be used to navigate during a workout. Users can "mark" their current location and then edit this entry's name and coordinates, which enables navigation to those new coordinates. The watch uses the hh.mm.mm (hours, minutes, and minute decimals) coordinate format. The 310XT can display additional formats; it also has a screen to display current coordinates in real-time.

=== Computer interface ===
The user can download a previously-travelled course/route to the Forerunner using Garmin's Communicator software together with the ANT+ technology, and then follow this course/route to "race" against this historical course/route. Until recently this download was possible via the tethered USB connection on the older 205 & 305 models. However, the current version of the software has eliminated this option, requiring the user to acquire a newer model with a wireless connection in order to use this feature.

The user can also make new courses or routes, which can be downloaded to the watch and then followed. This is a convenient way to go on a cross-country bike ride while navigating with the Forerunner. Note: navigating with a course is better than navigating with a route, because a Garmin course can store more points than a Garmin route.

Additionally, a user can create downloadable points of interest (POIs) by creating a custom map with Google Maps. POIs can be transferred to the 205 or 305 but not to the 405 or 310XT.

== Release history ==
Model	Release date	Image
Forerunner 101	2003-03-02	
Forerunner 201	2003-08-14	
Forerunner 301	2005-01-05	
Forerunner 205	2006-01-03	
Forerunner 305	2006-01-03	
Forerunner 50	2007-08-08	
Forerunner 405	2008-01-03	
Forerunner 60	2009-01-30	Image could not be found.
Forerunner 405CX	2009-04-02	
Forerunner 310XT	2009-04-02	
Forerunner 110	2010-03-29	
Forerunner 210	2010-10-04	
Forerunner 410	2010-10-04	Image could not be found.
Forerunner 610	2011-04-12	
Forerunner 910XT	2011-10-04	
Forerunner 10	2012-08-28	
Forerunner 220	2013-09-16	
Forerunner 620	2013-09-16	
Forerunner 15	2014-05-06	
Forerunner 920XT	2014-10-01	
Forerunner 225	2015-05-12	
Forerunner 25	2015-08-05	
Forerunner 230; Forerunner 235	2015-10-21	
Forerunner 630	2015-10-21	
Forerunner 735XT	2016-05-11	
Forerunner 35	2016-08-31	
Forerunner 935	2017-03-29	
Forerunner 30	2017-09-26	
Forerunner 645; Forerunner 645 Music	2018-01-08	
Forerunner 45 Forerunner 45S	2019-04-30	
Forerunner 245 Forerunner 245 Music	2019-04-30	
Forerunner 945	2019-04-30	
Forerunner 745	2020-09-16	Garmin forerunner 745
Forerunner 55	2021-06-02	Garmin Forerunner 55, a running smartwatch, on a wrist
Forerunner 945 LTE	2021-06-02	Image could not be found.
Forerunner 255 Forerunner 255 Music	2022-06-01	GarminForerunner255MusicWhitestone
Forerunner 955 Forerunner 955 Solar	2022-06-01	
Forerunner 265	2023-03-01	Image could not be found.
Forerunner 965	2023-03-01	
Forerunner 158	2023	
Forerunner 165	2024-02-20	
Forerunner 570	2025-05-15	
Forerunner 970	2025-05-15	
Forerunner 70	2026-05-12	
Forerunner 170	2026-05-12	

=== Timeline ===
2003	2004	2005	2006	2007	2008	2009	2010	2011	2012	2013	2014	2015		2016	2017	2018	2019	2020	2021	2022	2023	2024	2025	2026
										10		15	25	35		30		45/S		55				70
					50	60	110															165		170
101	201		205					210			220	225		230/235				245/245M			255	265		
		301	305			310XT																		
					405	405CX		410																
																	570							
									610		620			630		645/645M								
														735XT					745					
									910XT			920XT			935			945		945 LTE	955	965		970

== Feature comparison ==
Forerunner Model	30/35	45S/45	55	165	230	235	245	255S/255	265S/265	570	630	645	735XT	745	935	945	945 LTE	955	965	970		Instinct	Instinct 2S/2		fēnix 6S	fēnix 6	fēnix 6X
Release date	23/09/2017	30/04/2019	02/06/2021	20/02/2024	21/10/2015	21/10/2015	30/04/2019	01/06/2022	01/03/2023	15/05/2025	21/10/2015	08/01/2018	11/05/2016	16/09/2020	29/03/2017	30/04/2019	02/06/2021	01/06/2022	01/03/2023	15/05/2025		11/10/2018	09/02/2022		08/2019	08/2019	08/2019
Usage	Running							Triathlon			Running		Triathlon									Adventure			Adventure		
General																											
Width	35.5mm	39.5/42mm	42mm	43mm	45mm	45mm	42.3mm	41/45.6mm	41.7/46.1mm	42.4/47mm	45mm	42.5mm	44.5mm	43.8mm	47mm	47mm	44.4mm	46.5mm	47.2mm	47mm		45mm	40/45mm		42mm	47mm	51mm
Thickness	13.4mm	11.4mm	11.6mm	11.6mm	11.7mm	11.7mm	12.2mm	12.4/12.9mm	12.9/12.9mm	12.9mm	11.7mm	13.5mm	11.9mm	13.3mm	13.9mm	13.7mm	13.9mm	14.4mm	13.2mm	12.9mm		15.3mm	13.3/14.50mm		13.8mm	14.7mm	14.9mm
Strap width	22mm	18/20mm	20mm	20mm	22mm	22mm	20mm	18/22mm	18/22mm	20/22mm		20mm		22mm		22mm	22mm	22mm	22mm	22mm			20/22mm		20mm	22mm	26mm
Display size	23.5 x 23.4	Ø26.3mm	Ø26.3mm	Ø30.4mm	Ø31.1mm	Ø31.1mm	Ø30.4mm	Ø27.5/33mm	Ø28.1/32.5mm	Ø30.4/35.3mm	Ø31.1mm	Ø30.4mm	Ø31.1mm	Ø30.4mm	Ø30.5mm	Ø30.4mm	Ø30.4mm	Ø33mm	Ø35.4mm	Ø35.3mm			Ø20/Ø23mm		Ø30.4mm	Ø33.0mm	Ø35.6mm
Lens							GG3	GG3	GG3	GG3		GG3		GG DX		GG DX	GG DX	GG DX	GG DX	Sapphire			GG3		GG DX	GG DX	GG DX
Wr HRM sen.	2.gen	3.gen	3.gen	4.gen	no WHRM	2.gen	3.gen	4.gen	4.gen	5.gen (no ECG)	no WHRM	2.gen	2.gen	3.gen	2.gen	3.gen	4.gen	4.gen	4.gen	5.gen			4.gen		3.gen	3.gen	3.gen
Resolution	128x128	208x208	208x208	390x390	215x180	215x180	240x240	218x218/260x260	360x360/416x416	390x390/454x454	215x180	240x240	215x180	240x240	240x240	240x240	240x240	260x260	454x454	454x454		128x128	156x156/176x176		240x240	260x260	280x280
Weight	37.3g	32/36g	37g	39g	41g	42g	38.5g	39/49g	39/47g	42/50g	44g	42.2g	44g	47g	49g	50g	49g	53g	53g	56g		52g	42/52g		61g	72/83g	93g
Water rating	5 ATM	5 ATM	5 ATM	5 ATM	5 ATM	5 ATM	5 ATM	5 ATM	5 ATM	5 ATM	5 ATM	5 ATM	5 ATM	5 ATM	5 ATM	5 ATM	5 ATM	5 ATM	5 ATM	5 ATM		10 ATM	10 ATM		10 ATM	10 ATM	10 ATM
Screen Type	MIP Mono	MIP	MIP	Amoled	MIP	MIP	MIP	MIP	Amoled	Amoled	MIP	MIP	MIP	MIP	MIP	MIP	MIP	MIP	Amoled	Amoled		MIP Mono	MIP Mono		MIP	MIP	MIP
Sensors																											
GPS	Yes	Yes	Yes	Yes	Yes	Yes	Yes	Yes	Yes	Yes	Yes	Yes	Yes	Yes	Yes	Yes	Yes	Yes	Yes	Yes		Yes	Yes		Yes	Yes	Yes
GLONASS	No	Yes	Yes	Yes	Yes	Yes	Yes	Yes	Yes	Yes	Yes	Yes	Yes	Yes	Yes	Yes	Yes	Yes	Yes	Yes		Yes	Yes		Yes	Yes	Yes
Galileo	No	Yes	Yes	Yes	No	No	Yes	Yes	Yes	Yes	No	Yes	No	Yes	Yes	Yes	Yes	Yes	Yes	Yes		Yes	Yes		Yes	Yes	Yes
Multiband GPS	No	No	No	No	No	No	No	Yes	Yes	Yes	No	No	No	No	No	No	No	Yes	Yes	Yes		No	No		No	No	No
Wrist Heart Rate	Yes	Yes	Yes	Yes	No	Yes	Yes	Yes	Yes	Yes	No	Yes	Yes	Yes	Yes	Yes	Yes	Yes	Yes	Yes		Yes	Yes		Yes	Yes	Yes
Barometric Altimeter	No	No	No	Yes	No	No	No	Yes	Yes	Yes	No	Yes	No	Yes	Yes	Yes	Yes	Yes	Yes	Yes		Yes	Yes		Yes	Yes	Yes
Compass	No	No	No	Yes	No	No	Yes	Yes	Yes	Yes	Yes	Yes	Yes	Yes	Yes	Yes	Yes	Yes	Yes	Yes		Yes	Yes		Yes	Yes	Yes
Gyroscope	No	No	No	No	No	No	No	Yes	Yes	Yes	No	Yes	No	Yes	Yes	Yes	Yes	Yes	Yes	Yes		Yes	Yes		Yes	Yes	Yes
Accelerometer	Yes	Yes	Yes	Yes	Yes	Yes	Yes	Yes	Yes	Yes	Yes	Yes	Yes	Yes	Yes	Yes	Yes	Yes	Yes	Yes		Yes	Yes		Yes	Yes	Yes
Thermometer	No	No	No	Yes	No	No	No	Yes	Yes	Yes	No	Yes	No	Yes	Yes	Yes	Yes	Yes	Yes	Yes		Yes	Yes		Yes	Yes	Yes
Blood Oxygen Saturation	No	No	No	Yes	No	No	Yes	Yes	Yes	Yes	No	No	No	Yes	No	Yes	Yes	Yes	Yes	Yes		Yes	Yes		Yes	Yes	Yes
Other																											
Solar recharge	No	No	No	No	No	No	No	No	No	No	No	No	No	No	No	No	No	No	solar	No	solar		solar	solar	solar		
Topo maps	No	No	No	No	No	No	No	No	No	No	No	No	No	No	No	Yes	Yes	Yes	Yes	Yes		No	No		Yes	Yes	Yes
Garmin Pay	No	No	No	Yes	No	No	No	Yes	Yes	Yes	No	Yes	No	Yes	No	Yes	Yes	Yes	Yes	Yes		No	Yes		Yes	Yes	Yes
Spotify Music Storage	No	No	No	Music 4GB	No	No	Music	Music 4GB	Yes 8GB	Yes 8GB	No	No	No	Yes	No	Yes	Yes	Yes	Yes	Yes		No	No		Yes	Yes	Yes
Touch screen	No	No	No	Yes	No	No	No	No	Yes	Yes	No	No	No	No	No	No	No	Yes	Yes	Yes		No	No		No	No	No
LED flashlight	No	No	No	No	No	No	No	No	No	No	No	No	No	No	No	No	No	No	No	Yes							

Key: Current Model

== See also ==
- Garmin Fenix
