= Jen Kao =

American fashion designer

- Born: Jennifer Kao; July 15, 1981 (age 45); Los Angeles, California, U.S.
- Education: New York University (BFA); Parsons School of Design (MFA)
- Occupation: Fashion designer
- Label: Jen Kao
- Parent(s): Min Kao; Yu-Fan Kao

Jennifer Kao (Chinese: 高嘉旎; pinyin: Gāo Jiānǐ; born July 15, 1981) is an American fashion designer of Taiwanese ancestry.

== Early life and education ==
Daughter of Garmin co-founder Min Kao, Jen Kao was born in Los Angeles and grew up on the Kansas side of the Kansas City Metropolitan Area, where she graduated from the Pembroke Hill School in 1999. Thereafter, she received a degree in studio art from New York University and then a graduate degree from Parsons School of Design.

== Career ==
Kao's career began in 2007 when she debuted a spring collection at New York Fashion Week. Elle describes her designs as "art-inspired, intellectually approached, and meticulously executed." Her eponymous line is sold in New York City, Los Angeles, London, and Tokyo, in addition to various internet websites. Cate Blanchett, Angelina Jolie, Rihanna, Lady Gaga, Madonna, Zoe Kravitz, M.I.A., Elettra Wiedemann, Taylor Momsen, Fergie, Robin Wright, Harley Viera-Newton, and Rachel McAdams have worn her designs.

Kao was inducted into the Council of Fashion Designers of America (CFDA) in 2011.

In September 2013, a company spokeswoman announced that Kao would be closing her ready-to-wear line indefinitely due to unspecified health problems.
