= Garmin Fenix =

Series of GPS sport smartwatches

Fenix
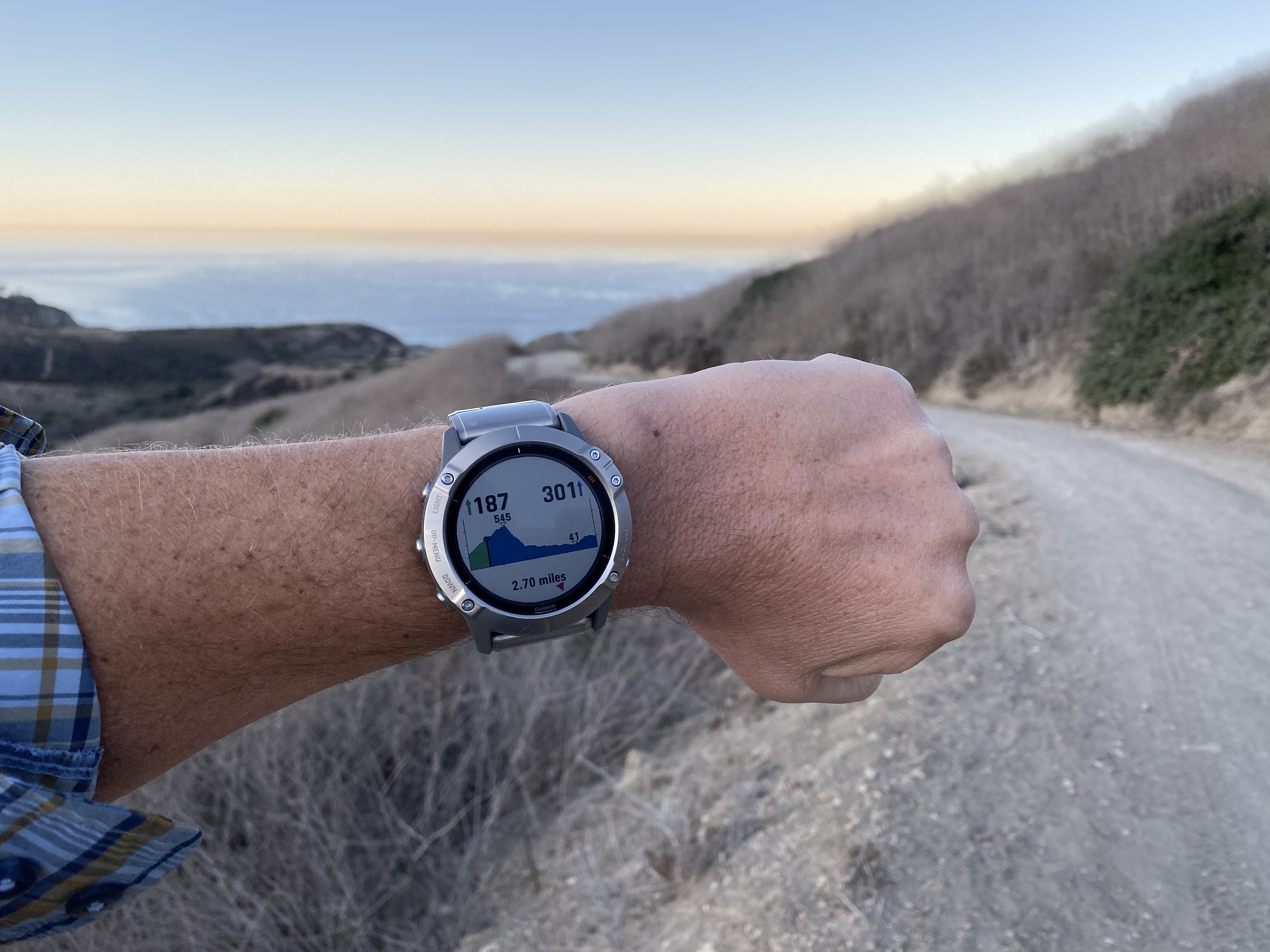
- Garmin Fenix 6X Pro Solar
- Manufacturer: Garmin
- Type: Multisport GPS watch
- Display: Transflective monochrome LCD (Fenix and Fenix 2); Color MIP LCD (Fenix 3 to 7 Pro; Solar-only from Fenix 8); AMOLED (non-Solar from Fenix 8 and Fenix E); MicroLED (Fenix 8 Pro 51 mm option)
- Introduced: July 10, 2012; 14 years ago

The Garmin Fenix (styled fēnix; pronounced as phoenix) is a series of multisport GPS watches produced by Garmin. First introduced in 2012, the Garmin Fenix is aimed at outdoor enthusiasts, adventurers, and athletes.

The Fenix watches offer tracking for a variety of outdoor and indoor activities, allowing users to monitor their performance and progress. Featuring Global Positioning System (GPS) navigation and, starting with the Fenix 5 Plus model, routable topographical maps, users can track routes, waypoints, and geographical data. The watches also record metrics such as time, distance, speed, pace, elevation, and heart rate.

The Fenix series is noted for its battery life, ruggedness, and durability, designed for use in outdoor activities.

== Models ==
Model(s)	Announced	HR sensor	Notes / Major new features	Launch MSRP (USD)
Fenix	July 10, 2012	Chest strap only	First-generation GPS watch focused on outdoor navigation, featuring ABC sensors and basic fitness features	$399.99
Fenix 2	February 20, 2014	Chest strap only	Introduced advanced training features, running/swimming metrics, and expanded ANT+ sensor support	$399.99
Fenix 3	January 5, 2015	Chest strap only	Introduced color MIP (Memory-in-Pixel) display and Garmin Connect IQ app support	$499.99–$599.99
Fenix 3 HR	January 5, 2016	Elevate Gen 1	Mid-cycle refresh: introduced optical wrist-based heart rate monitoring	$599.99–$799.99
Fenix Chronos	August 25, 2016	Elevate Gen 1	Luxury series with premium materials and multisport functionality	$899.99–$1,499.99
Fenix 5	January 4, 2017	Elevate Gen 2	Introduced multiple sizes (5S, 5, 5X), preloaded mapping (on 5X), and expanded wrist HR and training features	$599.99–$699.99
Fenix 5 Plus	June 18, 2018	Elevate Gen 2	Mid-cycle refresh: introduced maps, music, and Garmin Pay across all models, and Pulse Ox on 5X Plus	$699.99–$1,149.99
Fenix 6 and Fenix 6 Pro	August 29, 2019	Elevate Gen 3	Introduced larger displays and improved battery management; solar charging option on Pro models only	$599.99–$1,149.99
Fenix 6 Solar	July 8, 2020	Elevate Gen 3	Mid-cycle refresh: introduced solar charging option across all models	$849.99
Fenix 7	January 18, 2022	Elevate Gen 4	Introduced touchscreen; multi-band GNSS on Sapphire Solar and built-in LED flashlight on 7X models only^{[note]}	$699.99–$999.99
Fenix 7 Pro	May 31, 2023	Elevate Gen 5	Mid-cycle refresh: updated MIP display, added multi-band GNSS with SatIQ and flashlight across all models	$799.99–$999.99
Fenix 8	August 27, 2024	Elevate Gen 5	AMOLED option (non-Solar), speaker/mic, dive features, new solar panel, and new system software branch	$999.99–$1,199.99
Fenix E	August 27, 2024	Elevate Gen 4	AMOLED-only; lacks speaker/mic, flashlight, and multi-band GNSS; lower-cost alternative to Fenix 8	$799.99
Fenix 8 Pro	September 3, 2025	Elevate Gen 5	Introduced inReach satellite + LTE for communication and SOS; 4,500-nit MicroLED option in 51 mm	$1,199.99–$1,999.99
Fenix 9 and Fenix 9 Pro	August 25, 2026	Elevate Gen 5	Introduced brighter displays, 64 GB storage, and faster mapping engine; full titanium case on Pro models only	$999.99–$1,399.99

== See also ==
- Garmin Forerunner

== Notes ==
a. The Garmin Fenix 7 and the second-generation Garmin Epix, while essentially sharing the same core features, diverge notably in their display technology and battery performance. While the Fenix series retains its energy-efficient transflective memory-in-pixel (MiP) display, the Epix Gen 2 features an AMOLED color display, at the expense of higher battery consumption.
