= Garmin inReach =

Satellite communications device brand

inReach
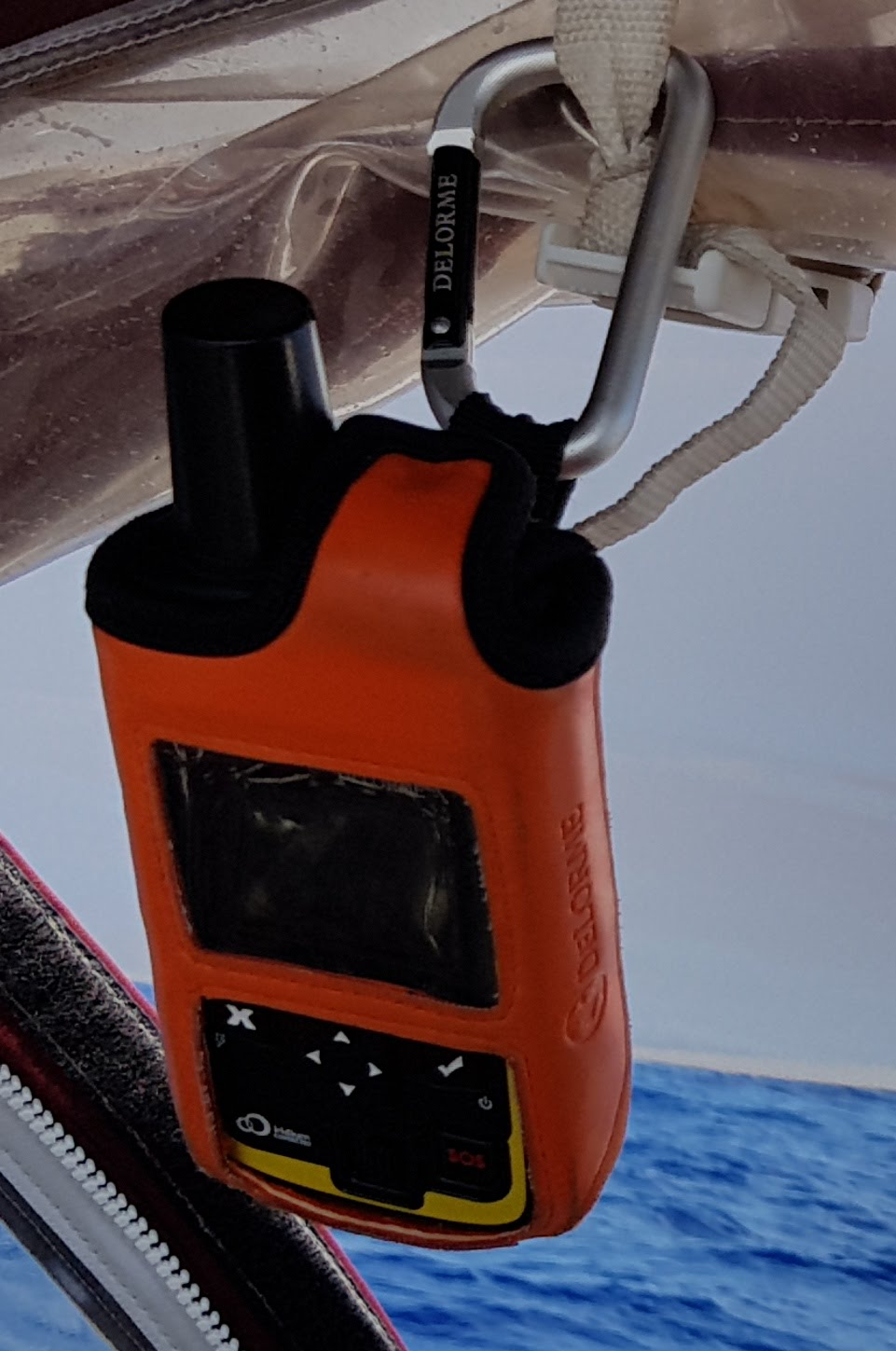
- inReach SE
- Developer: DeLorme (2011—2016); Garmin (2016—)
- Released: 2011

inReach is a brand of satellite communications device which is developed by Garmin. inReach devices use the Iridium satellite constellation, which forms a mesh with 100% globe coverage.

All inReach devices feature texting, remote location tracking, and SOS via satellite. Newer devices feature Weather. Some devices have offline maps or breadcrumb tracking, and some devices have the ability to send images and voice messages. Usage of all satellite features—including SOS—requires an active subscription. Usage may also incur metered pricing, depending on the tier of the subscription.

When a user hits the SOS button, the device broadcasts the user's location every minute for 10 minutes, then falls back to a 10 minute interval. A conversation is initiated between the user and the Garmin Response Team, who notifies emergency contacts, determines an appropriate course of action, and facilities communication between the user and responders. As of 2024, Garmin had handled 15,000 incidents.

== History ==
In 2011, DeLorme announced its first inReach, which was the first personal satellite communication device equipped for two-way text messaging using satellites. They released two models, with one pairing to their PN-60w GPS device, and one pairing to a Smartphone. Plans started at $12.95/m with a 12 month commitment.

In 2013, DeLorme announced the inReach SE (Screen Edition), which was capable of usage without tethering to an additional device. In 2015, they announced the inReach Explorer, which featured GPS navigation in addition to satellite texting.

Garmin acquired DeLorme in 2016. In 2017, Garmin released their first inReach devices: The inReach SE+ and Explorer+. These devices added weather over satellite.

In 2018, Garmin announced the inReach Mini, which came in a smaller form factor than the SE and Explorer. While the Mini was capable of drawing GPS breadcrumbs, it lacked a detailed map and colored display.

In 2022 Garmin announced the Mini 2. They also announced the inReach Messenger, which came in a puck form factor which was designed to lie flat instead of vertically, and entirely lacked navigation functionality.

In 2024, Garmin announced the inReach Messenger Plus. Devices with the "inReach Plus" branding feature message size limits of 1600 instead of 160, as well as support for sending images and voice messages.

=== Chronological overview ===
Since the Explorer+, no products in the inReach product line have featured GPS navigation. Instead, other Garmin devices have featured inReach technology, often as an add-on feature for an additional cost. These include some Fenix smartwatches, as well as select GPSMAP, Montana, and Tread GPS navigators.

Legend:	Discontinued	Current

	Release date	Max Power	Images	Weather	GPS
inReach	2011		No	No	Point
inReach SE	2013		No	No	Breadcrumbs
inReach Explorer	2015		No	No	Map
inReach SE+	2017	31.7 dBm	No	Yes	Breadcrumbs
inReach Explorer+	2017	31.7 dBm	No	Yes	Map
inReach Mini	2018	31.7 dBm	No	Yes	Breadcrumbs
inReach Mini 2	2022	31.8 dBm	No	Yes	Breadcrumbs
inReach Messenger	2022	35.9 dBm	No	Yes	Point
inReach Messenger Plus	2024	39.7 dBm	Yes	Yes	Point
inReach Mini 3	2025	34.2 dBm	No	Yes	Breadcrumbs
inReach Mini 3 Plus	2025	36.7 dBm	Yes	Yes	Breadcrumbs

== Reception ==
The inReach has received positive reception from reviewers. The first three of Gearlab's top satellite communicators as of 2025 are inReach devices, and Outdoor Life ranks the inReach Messenger as its 'Best Overall' choice.

When Apple released its satellite messaging features, comparisons were drawn to the inReach. In general, reviewers heralded the iPhone for increasing the accessibility of satellite messaging, but found the inReach to be more reliable for its increased battery, durability, and sending speed.

In some countries, satellite communicators are banned, leading to arrests and fines. In 2024, a Canadian and a Scottish woman were separately detained in India for possession of such devices.
