= Min Kao =

Co-founder of Garmin

Min H. Kao
- 高民環
- Born: 1949 (age 76–77); Zhushan, Taiwan
- Education: National Taiwan University (BS); University of Tennessee (MS, PhD)
- Occupations: Co-founder and chairman, Garmin
- Spouse: Fan Kao
- Children: 2, including Jen Kao

Min Hwan Kao (Chinese: 高民環; pinyin: Gāo Mínhuán) is a Taiwanese-American electrical engineer, billionaire businessman, and philanthropist. He is the co-founder of Garmin, with Gary Burrell, and has been its chairman.

In 2011, Kao was elected a member of the National Academy of Engineering for leadership in developing and commercializing compact GPS navigation devices.

== Early life and education ==
Min Hwan Kao was born in 1949 in Zhushan, Nantou, a small town in Taiwan. He graduated from National Taiwan University with a bachelor's degree in electrical engineering, then completed graduate studies in the United States at the University of Tennessee, where he earned his Master of Science (M.S.) in 1974 and his Ph.D. in electrical engineering in 1977.

== Career ==
Kao undertook research for NASA and the United States Army. He was subsequently a systems analyst for Teledyne Systems, an algorithm designer for Magnavox Advanced Products, and an engineering group leader for King Radio Corporation. He also worked for AlliedSignal.

In 1989, with Gary Burrell, Kao co-founded Garmin, a company best known for manufacturing devices that use the Global Positioning System.

Kao stepped down as CEO of Garmin in 2012, but remains executive chairman and a member of the board.

== Philanthropy ==
In 2005, Kao gave $17.5 million to the College of Engineering of the University of Tennessee, $12.5 million of which was designated for the construction of a new facility. In May 2007, groundbreaking ceremonies were conducted for the new Min Kao Electrical Engineering and Computer Science Building. The building was dedicated in March 2012.

In 2014, Kao donated $1 million to the University of Kansas College of Engineering for the building of electrical and computer engineering design labs. In 2015, Kao donated $1 million to the Kansas State University College of Engineering for building four labs.

== Awards ==
- In September 2024, Kao was inducted into the National Aviation Hall of Fame in Dayton, Ohio.

== Personal life ==
Kao is married to Fan Kao. They have a son, Ken Kao, who is a film producer, and a daughter, Jen Kao, who is a fashion designer. They reside in Leawood, Kansas. In 2011, he purchased an apartment in 15 Central Park West, Manhattan, New York City. He spends the majority of his time in Manhattan.

As of February 2020, his personal wealth was estimated at $4.1 billion.

In 2021 Kao was selected by the Carnegie Corporation as a "Great Immigrant, Great American".
