= Garmin =

Multinational technology company

Garmin Ltd.
- Formerly: ProNav (1989–1990)
- Type: Public
- Traded as: NYSE: GRMN; S&P 500 component
- ISIN: CH0114405324
- Industry: Technology; Consumer electronics Software services Online services
- Founded: October 1989; 37 years ago (as ProNav) in Lenexa, Kansas, U.S.
- Founders: Gary Burrell; Min Kao
- Headquarters: Olathe, Kansas, U.S. (operations); Schaffhausen, Switzerland (legal domicile)
- Area served: Worldwide
- Key people: Cliff Pemble (President & CEO); Min Kao (Chairman); Patrick Desbois (Co-COO); Brad Trenkle (Co-COO)
- Products: GNSS receivers, avionics, wearable technology
- Revenue: ▲US$7.25 billion (2025)
- Operating income: ▲US$1.88 billion (2025)
- Net income: ▲US$1.66 billion (2025)
- Total assets: ▲US$11.0 billion (2025)
- Total equity: ▲US$8.97 billion (2025)
- Number of employees: 23,000 (2025)
- Website: garmin.com

Garmin Ltd. is an American multinational technology company based in Olathe, Kansas. The company designs, develops, manufactures, markets, and distributes GPS-enabled products and other navigation, communication, sensor-based, and information products to the automotive, aviation, marine, outdoors, and sport markets.

Garmin was founded in 1989 by Gary Burrell and Min Kao in Lenexa, Kansas. In 1996, the company established corporate headquarters in Olathe, Kansas. Since 2010, the company has been legally incorporated in Schaffhausen, Switzerland, with principal subsidiaries located in the United States, Taiwan, and the United Kingdom.

As of 2025, the company has nearly 23,000 employees in 34 countries and generated US$7.25 billion in revenue. Garmin was initially associated with personal in-car navigation devices, but now offers several product lines across different markets, with an emphasis on smartwatch technology. In 2022, Garmin smartwatches represented the largest market share of the premium smartwatch market (watches greater than $500), leading to it having the fifth largest share of overall smartwatches sold and the third by revenue.

As of February 2023, Garmin has shipped more than 282 million products worldwide.

== History ==
=== Founding and initial growth: 1989 to 1999 ===
In 1983, Gary Burrell recruited Min H. Kao from the defense contractor Magnavox while working for the former King Radio. They founded Garmin in 1989 in Lenexa, Kansas, as "ProNav". ProNav's first product was a Global Positioning System (GPS) unit for boaters called GPS 100. It debuted at the 1990 International Marine Technology Exposition, where it garnered 5,000 orders. A short time later, in 1991, the company opened a manufacturing facility in Taiwan.

The company was later renamed "Garmin", a portmanteau of the first names of its two founders, Gary Burrell and Min H. Kao. In 1991, the U.S. Army became its first customer.

In 1994, Garmin released GPS 155, the first IFR-certified aviation navigation system. By 1995, Garmin's sales had reached $102 million, and it had achieved a profit of $23 million. In 1996, the company headquarters moved to Olathe, Kansas. A year later, Garmin sold its one millionth unit.

In 1998, Garmin released the GNS 430 and StreetPilot. GNS 430 was an integrated avionics system that served as both GPS navigation receiver and communications transceiver. StreetPilot was Garmin’s first portable navigation system for cars.

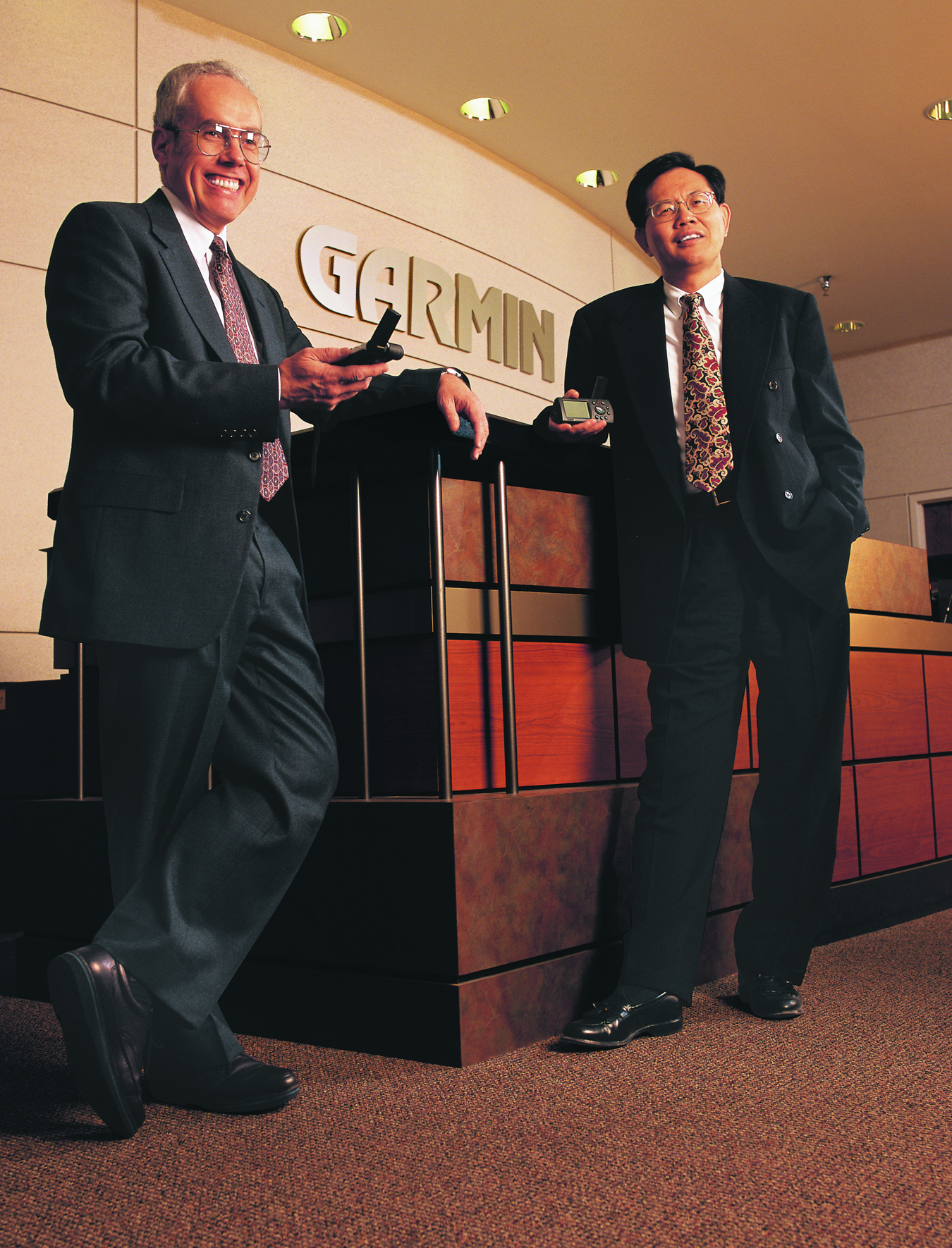
Founders Gary Burrell and Min Kao

By 1999, sales had reached $232.6 million with a profit of $64 million.

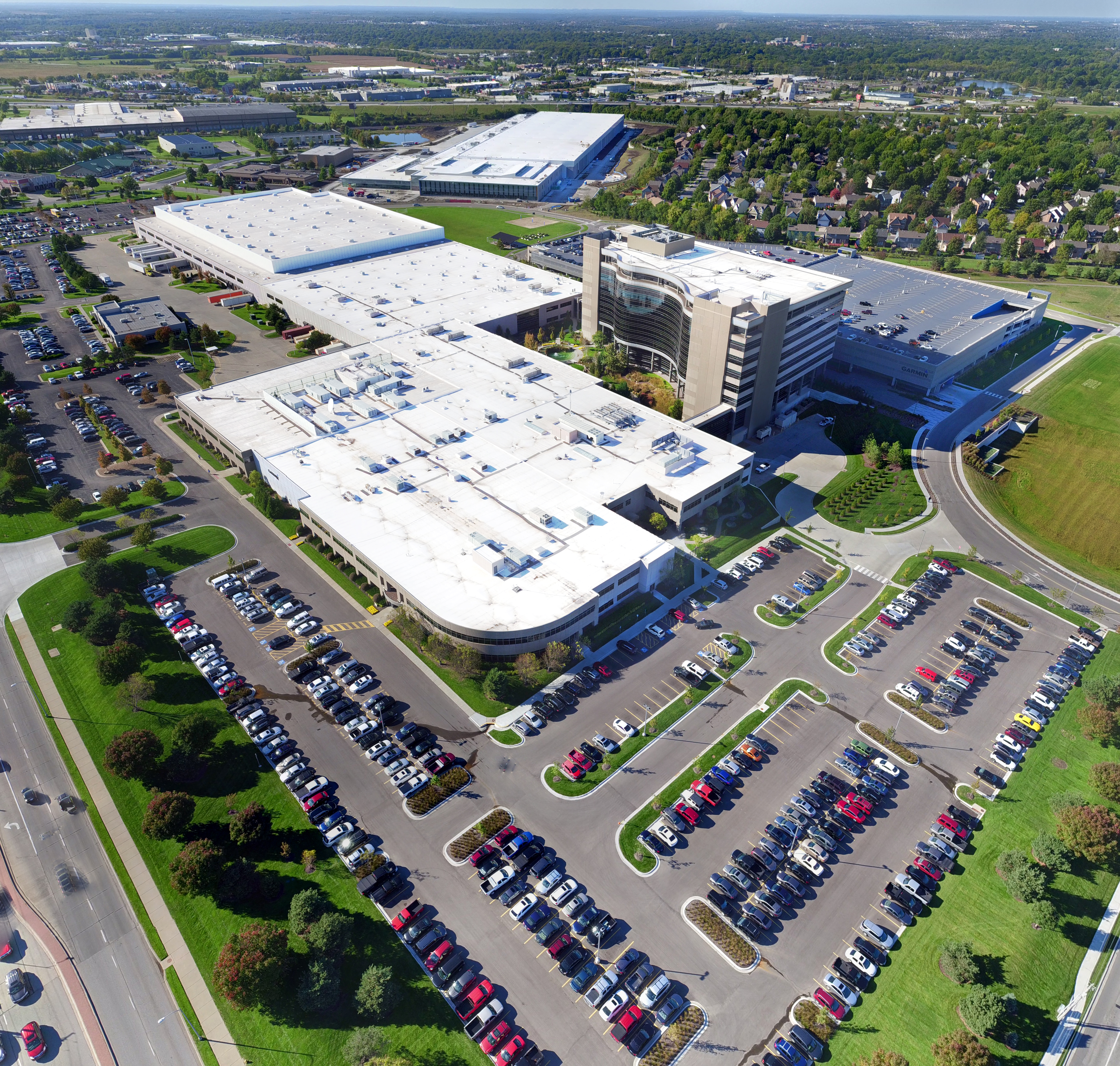
Garmin headquarters in Olathe, Kansas since 1996

=== GPS growth and additional markets: 2000 to 2018 ===
On Dec. 8, 2000, Garmin began public trading on NASDAQ with a stock price of $14 per share. Twenty-one years later on Dec. 7, 2021, the company transferred its listing to the New York Stock Exchange.

By 2000, Garmin had sold three million GNSS devices, and was producing 50 different models. Its products were sold in 100 countries and carried by 2,500 independent distributors. As of August 22, 2000, the company held 35 patents on GNSS technology. By the end of June 2000, the company employed 1,205 people: 541 in the United States, 635 in Taiwan, and 29 in the United Kingdom.

In 2003, Garmin announced its G1000 integrated cockpit system, although it did not become available until 2004 when it received FAA certification. It was first adopted by aircraft makers including Cessna and Diamond Aircraft, and was later installed as forward-fit and retrofit applications in regional airliners, business jets and turboprops, light airplanes, helicopters, and military and government aircraft.

That same year, Garmin launched the Forerunner 201, a fitness smartwatch for runners that was the first wrist-based GPS trainer.

In 2005, Garmin launched the nüvi series of compact car navigators, starting with the 300 and 350. In 2006, Garmin released Edge, its first GPS-enabled cycling computer. That same year, the company introduced a new corporate logo and opened its first retail store, located on Michigan Avenue in Chicago, Illinois. Garmin reported a 2006 total revenue of $1.77 billion, up 73% from $1.03 billion in 2005.

In 2007, the company introduced its first touchscreen marine chartplotters, the GPSMAP 5000 series, designed for international boaters.

In 2011, Garmin released its first GPS golf watch, the Approach S1. A year later, in 2012, the company released its fēnix adventure smartwatch, designed for outdoor sports and recreation.

In 2014, Garmin released Vivofit, its first wearable fitness band with a replaceable battery and a battery life of over one year. The Vivofit tracked a wearer’s steps and learned an individual’s activity level in order to adjust daily goals. In 2014, Garmin also acquired the New Zealand company Fusion Electronics Limited and its subsidiaries. After the acquisition, Fusion Electronics Limited, which sold integrated marine audio products and accessories, was renamed Garmin New Zealand Ltd.

In 2015, Garmin launched Panoptix, the first sonar system to provide real-time live imaging for anglers.

A year later, in 2016, Garmin acquired DeLorme, which gave Garmin DeLorme’s inReach satellite communication technology with interactive SOS messaging. The inReach Satellite Communicator had been the first personal satellite communication device equipped for two-way text messaging using satellites. In 2017, Garmin released their first devices made with inReach: the inReach SE+ and Explorer+.

In 2017, Garmin released its first dive computer with surface GPS, the Descent Mk1. The Mk1 also provided an altimeter and HR monitor, and used Garmin’s fenix 5X platform for everyday activity tracking.

=== Recent market expansion: 2018 to present ===
In 2018, Garmin improved its Panoptix technology by combining it with Livescope. The new Panoptix Livescope provided both scanning or imaging sonar as well as real-time, live sonar.

In April 2018, Garmin launched Connect IQ 3.0 along with new apps—MySwim Pro, Yelp, Trailforks and iHeartRadio. In May 2018, Garmin partnered with the University of Kansas Medical Center to tackle sleep apnea and atrial fibrillation.

In 2019, Garmin announced the release of new technologies in several fields. In its Automotive segment, there was an all-terrain, all-in-one GPS, the Garmin Overlander; for the Marine segment, a freshwater trolling motor, the Force; and under Garmin’s Aviation segment, an emergency autonomous landing system for aircraft, Garmin Autoland.

In 2020, Garmin Autoland won the Robert J. Collier Trophy for outstanding contributions to aviation and aerospace.

In 2022, Garmin released a new health monitoring device with its first smart blood pressure monitor, Index BPM. Index BPM is FDA-cleared, and can be used by up to 16 different people. The following year, Garmin introduced the FDA-cleared ECG app, allowing users to record heart rhythm and check for atrial fibrillation.

In 2023, Garmin announced a two-year study with the U.S. Space Force. Under the study, over 6000 Garmin Forerunner 55 and Instinct 2 Solar watches were given to members of Space Force (known as Guardians). The study aims to answer the question of whether or not regular active fitness testing can be replaced by fitness assessments made with data from the smartwatches. In addition to their health and wellness features, the watches were chosen because they have the ability to disable GPS functionality, should there be a need for higher military privacy and security. That same year, the company announced that Garmin fenix 7 watches would be used by crew members during the Polaris Dawn space mission to monitor health stats and vitals.

In 2024, the Independent Boat Builders, Inc. (IBBI) selected Garmin as its exclusive marine electronics and audio supplier. The selection starts in model year 2025 and runs through 2029.

On July 2026, Garmin announced the Cirqa Smart Band, a screenless fitness tracker worn on the wrist or arm. It tracks heart rate, energy levels, sleep, and skin temperature, syncing all data directly to the Garmin Connect app. The device features a 10-day battery life and comes in multiple sizes and colors. Unlike its main competitor, Whoop, the Cirqa requires no subscription fee to access its full suite of health metrics.

In the same month, Garmin announced it has acquired the TrainingPeaks and TrainHeroic training platforms for athletes and coaches.

=== Public offering ===
In December 2021, Garmin began trading on the New York Stock Exchange (NYSE) under the ticker symbol NYSE: GRMN. Previously, the company had traded on the NASDAQ exchange.

=== Acquisitions ===
In August 2003, Garmin completed acquisition of UPS Aviation Technologies, Inc. based in Salem, Oregon, a subsidiary of United Parcel Service, Inc., expanding its product line of panel-mounted GPS/NAV/COMM units and integrated cockpit systems for private and commercial aircraft. The acquired company changed its name to Garmin AT, Inc. and continued operations as a wholly owned subsidiary of Garmin International, Inc.

Garmin has acquired Dynastream Innovations, EME Tec Sat SAS (EME), and Digital Cyclone. Dynastream, in Cochrane, Alberta, produces personal monitoring technology (ANT+)—such as foot pods and heart rate monitors for sports and fitness products—and also ultra-low-power and low-cost wireless connectivity devices for a wide range of applications (ANT). EME Tec Sat SAS is the distributor of Garmin's consumer products in France; following the acquisition, EME changed its name to Garmin France SAS. Digital Cyclone Inc (DCI), located in Chanhassen, Minnesota, provides mobile weather services to consumers, pilots, and outdoor enthusiasts.

In 2007, Garmin bought Nautamatic Marine Systems, an Oregon-based company that makes autopilot systems for boats. In July 2011, Garmin finished its acquisition of the German satellite navigation company Navigon.

In 2015, Garmin acquired South Africa's iKubu Ltd. for its Backtracker on-bicycle low power radar system.

In 2016, Garmin acquired DeLorme, which gave Garmin DeLorme’s inReach satellite communication technology.

In 2017, Garmin acquired Navionics, a privately held manufacturer of nautical charts and mobile applications.

In 2019, Garmin acquired Tacx, a privately held Dutch company that designs and manufacturers indoor bike trainers, tools and accessories, as well as indoor training software and applications.

In 2020, Garmin acquired Firstbeat Analytics from Firstbeat Technologies. Firstbeat Analytics designs physiological-measurement algorithms used by health and wellness devices. Prior to the acquisition, Garmin and Firstbeat had a partnership to create dynamic training programs for athletes based on activity and fitness data captured throughout the day.

In 2021 Garmin acquired AeroData, a Scottsdale, Arizona based company that provides aircraft performance software for over 135 airlines worldwide. The company will continue to operate under the AeroData brand. Garmin also acquired Fltplan.com, a company that provides flight-planning, scheduling, and trip-support services; and, Geos Worldwide, an emergency monitoring and response service.

In 2021, Garmin acquired GEOS Worldwide, a provider of emergency monitoring and incident response services.

In 2022, Garmin acquired Vesper Marine, a privately held provider of AIS, VH, and vessel monitoring solutions.

In 2023, Garmin announced a definitive agreement to acquire JL Audio.

=== Leadership ===
Cliff Pemble is the current CEO of Garmin.

In October 2023, Garmin’s co-founders, Gary Burrell and Dr. Min Kao, were named to the U.S. National Aviation Hall of Fame class of 2024.

Burrell retired in 2002 as Garmin's chief executive officer and in 2004 retired as co-chairman of its board of directors. He remained chairman emeritus until his death in 2019. Kao became CEO in 2003, and chairman in 2004.

In 2005, Forbes estimated Kao's net worth at $1.5 billion. He has donated $17.5 million to the University of Tennessee. The same year Forbes estimated Burrell's net worth as $940 million.

=== July 2020 outage ===
On July 23, 2020, Garmin shut down its call centres, website and some online services, including Garmin Connect and flyGarmin, after a ransomware attack encrypted its internal network and some production systems. The company did not say it was a ransomware attack, but company employees writing on social media described it as such, with some speculation about a ransomware strain called WastedLocker later confirmed. Hackers reportedly demanded a $10 million ransom from Garmin. The company instituted a "multi-day maintenance window" to deal with the attack's impacts. Some Garmin online services began to function again on July 27, 2020, though delays in synchronising data with connected applications were expected; Strava anticipated a delay of "a week or longer". Experts speculated that Garmin had paid hackers a reported $10m ransom, or brokered some other kind of deal.

The outage meant Garmin could not receive calls or emails, or conduct online chats. Athlete users of Garmin wearables could not upload mileage, location, heart rate, and other data. Pilots were unable to download data for Garmin aircraft navigational systems, preventing flight scheduling. Garmin said there was "no indication" that personal information had been stolen.

== Operations ==
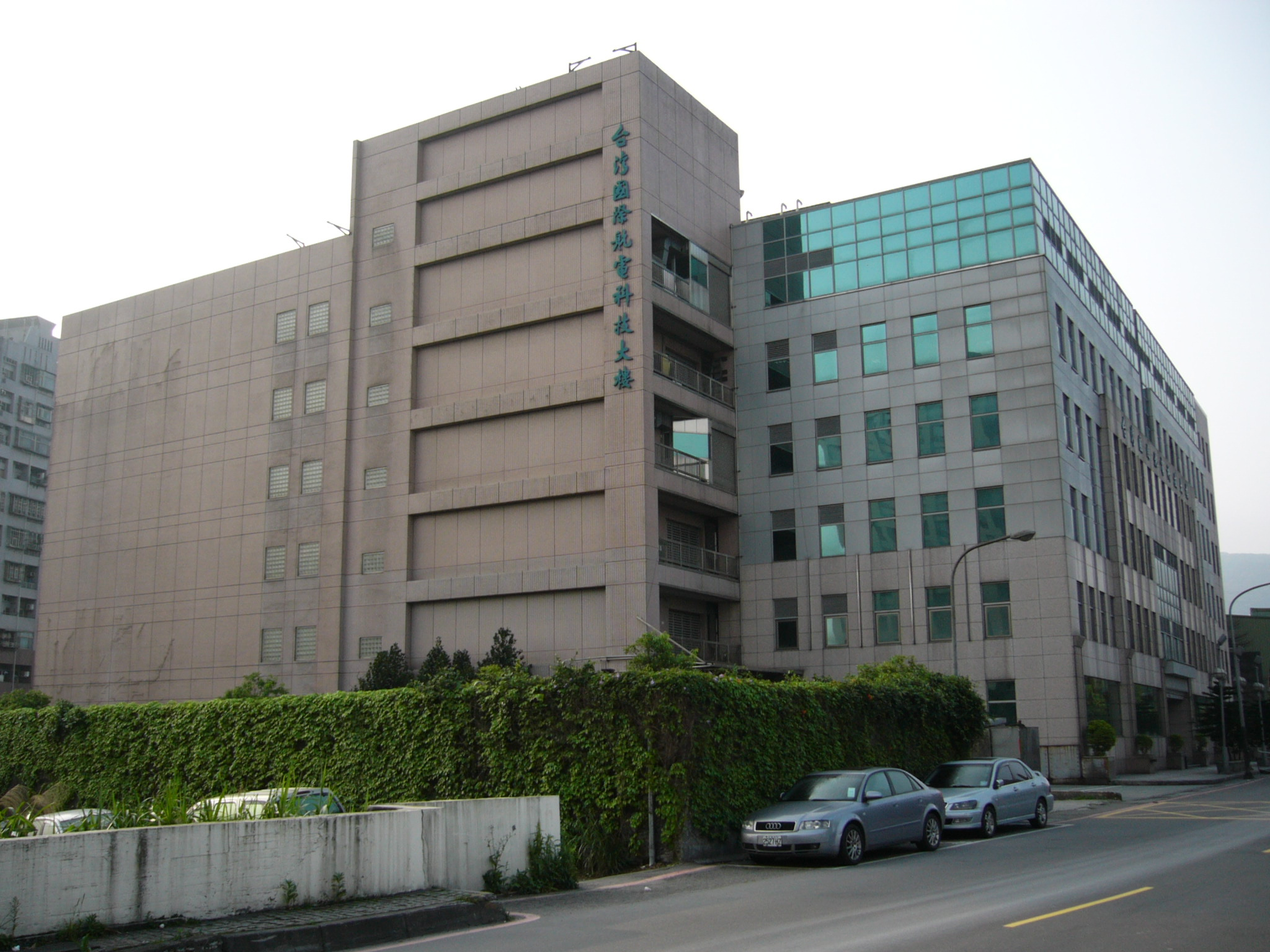
Garmin Tech Center (台灣國際航電科技大樓) is the head office of Garmin (Asia) Corporation and located in the Xizhi District of New Taipei City, Taiwan.

In 2010, Garmin opened a facility in Cary, North Carolina, as part of Research Triangle Park. Garmin operates in several other countries besides the UK, US, and Taiwan. It operates as Formar (Belgium), Garmin AMB (Canada), Belanor (Norway), Trepat (Spain), and Garmin-Cluj (Romania).

== Products ==
=== Fitness ===
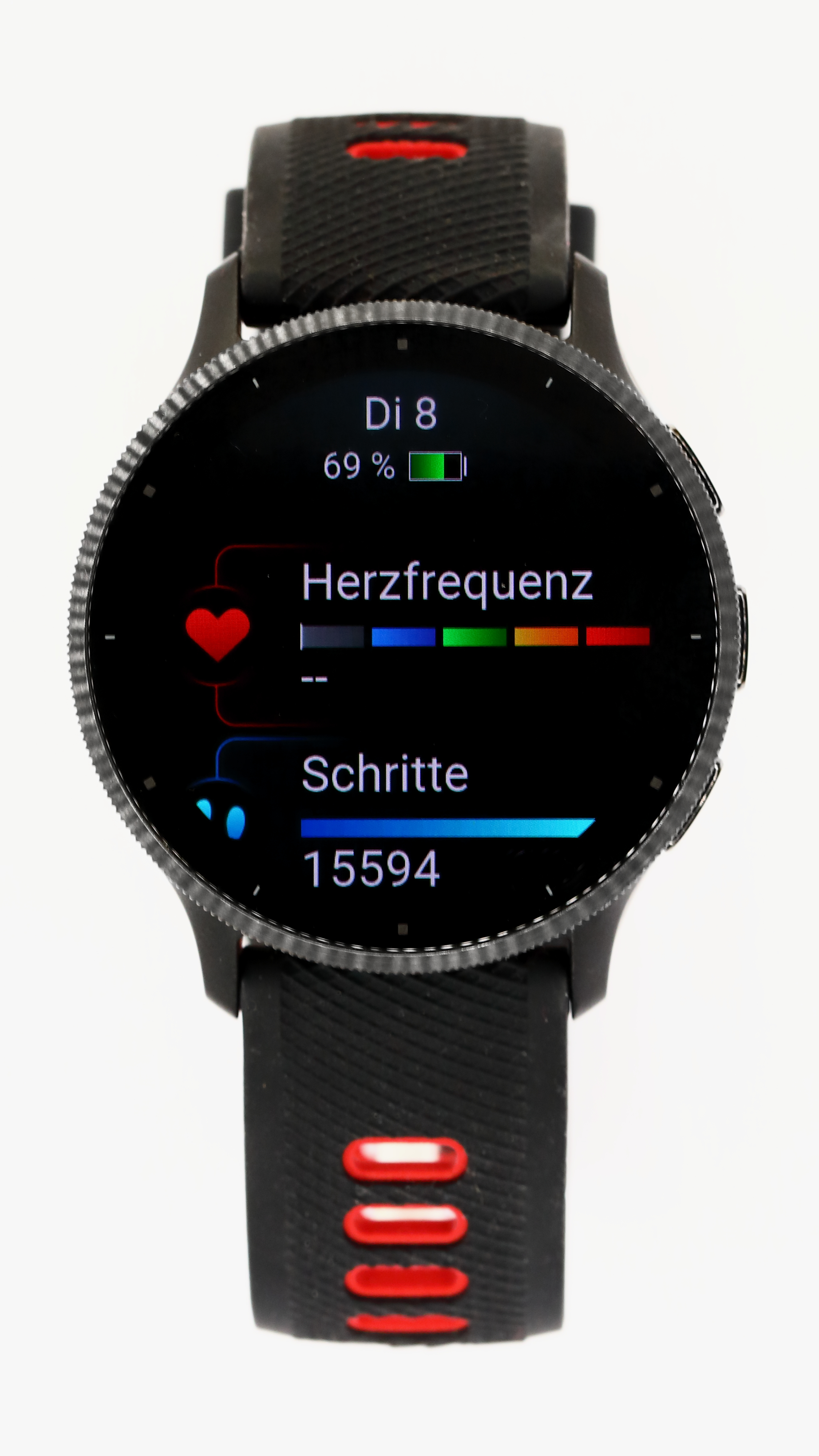
Garmin Venu 3 fitness smartwatch

Garmin produces a range of products and applications for use in health, wellness, and fitness activities, to include running and multisport watches, cycling products, smartwatch devices, scales and monitors, Garmin Connect and Garmin Connect Mobile, and the Connect IQ application development platform.

A few select products in this category include Forerunner, Edge, Index, Varia, Vivofit and Venu. Some of the features include optical heart rate sensors, Body Battery energy monitoring, contactless payment.

The Vivofit and Vivosmart ranges are activity trackers. The Garmin Vivofit 3 measures the wearer's duration and quality of sleep, quantifies body movement, records heart rate, counts steps and the number of stairs climbed. Garmin produces the Vivosmart HR. It comes with the touch screen and includes heart rate monitoring, media player controls, smart notifications and phone finder features.

The Vivomove is a traditionally styled watch with activity tracking capabilities. It has a built-in accelerometer (calculates distance during indoor workouts, without the need for a foot pod), step counter, auto goal (learns the wearer's activity level and assigns a daily step goal), move bar, and sleep-monitoring capabilities.

In the early 2000s Garmin launched a series of personal GNSS devices aimed at recreational runners called the Forerunner.

The Forerunner series is aimed primarily at runners, but the watches are more broadly focused, especially at the higher end. The 735 XT has multi-sport tracking capabilities (automatically switching between sports, for example in a triathlon) and a variety of special profiles for jogging, swimming, cycling, skiing, paddle sports, various weight loss activities, and hiking. It comes with a built-in heart rate sensor and GPS.

The Garmin Edge and certain models of Garmin Forerunner are a suite of GPS-enabled devices for use while running or cycling.

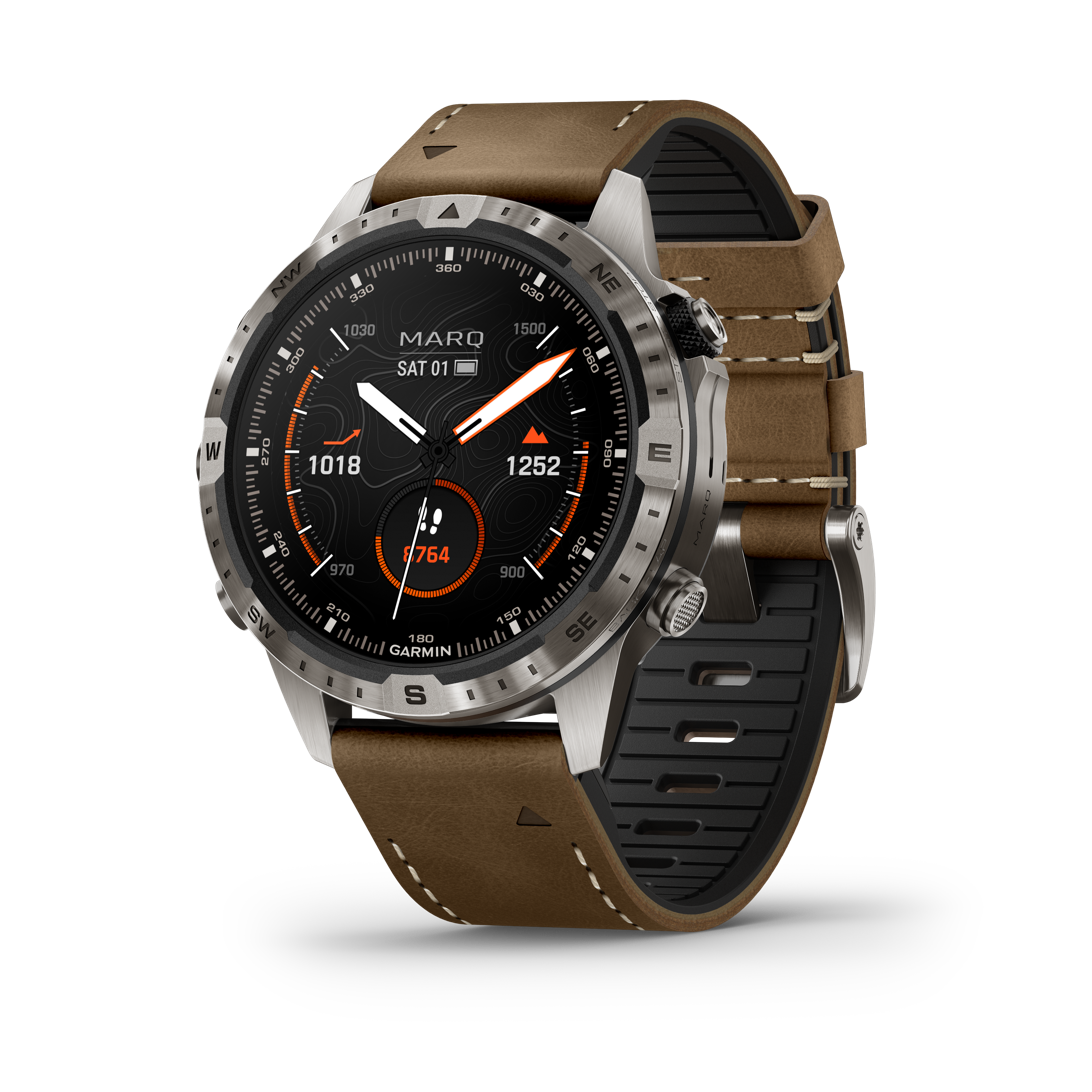
Garmin Marq (Gen2) Adventurer

=== Outdoor recreation ===
Garmin offers a range of products designed for use in outdoor activities. These include adventure watches, dive computers, golf watches and rangefinders, outdoor handhelds and satellite communicators, consumer automotive GPS devices, and dog tracking and training devices.

A few select products in this category include fenix (a multisport adventure watch), Descent, Approach, inReach, the Garmin Drive series and Alpha. Notable outdoor segment feature integrations, applications and services include Solar charging technology, the Garmin Golf app and Garmin Response international emergency coordination center.

=== Wristwear ===
Garmin produces activity trackers and sports watches, aimed at activities such as running, watersports, golf, cycling and swimming with sensors such as heart rate and gps. Some recent models add Bluetooth music playback and pulse-oximetry.

=== iQue PDA receivers ===
In 2003, Garmin launched the iQue line of integrated PDA–GPS receivers. On October 31, 2005, the iQue M4 became the first PDA that did not require a PC to preload the maps. The American version came with built-in maps of North America, while the UK version was supplied pre-loaded with maps of Western Europe.

=== eTrex ===
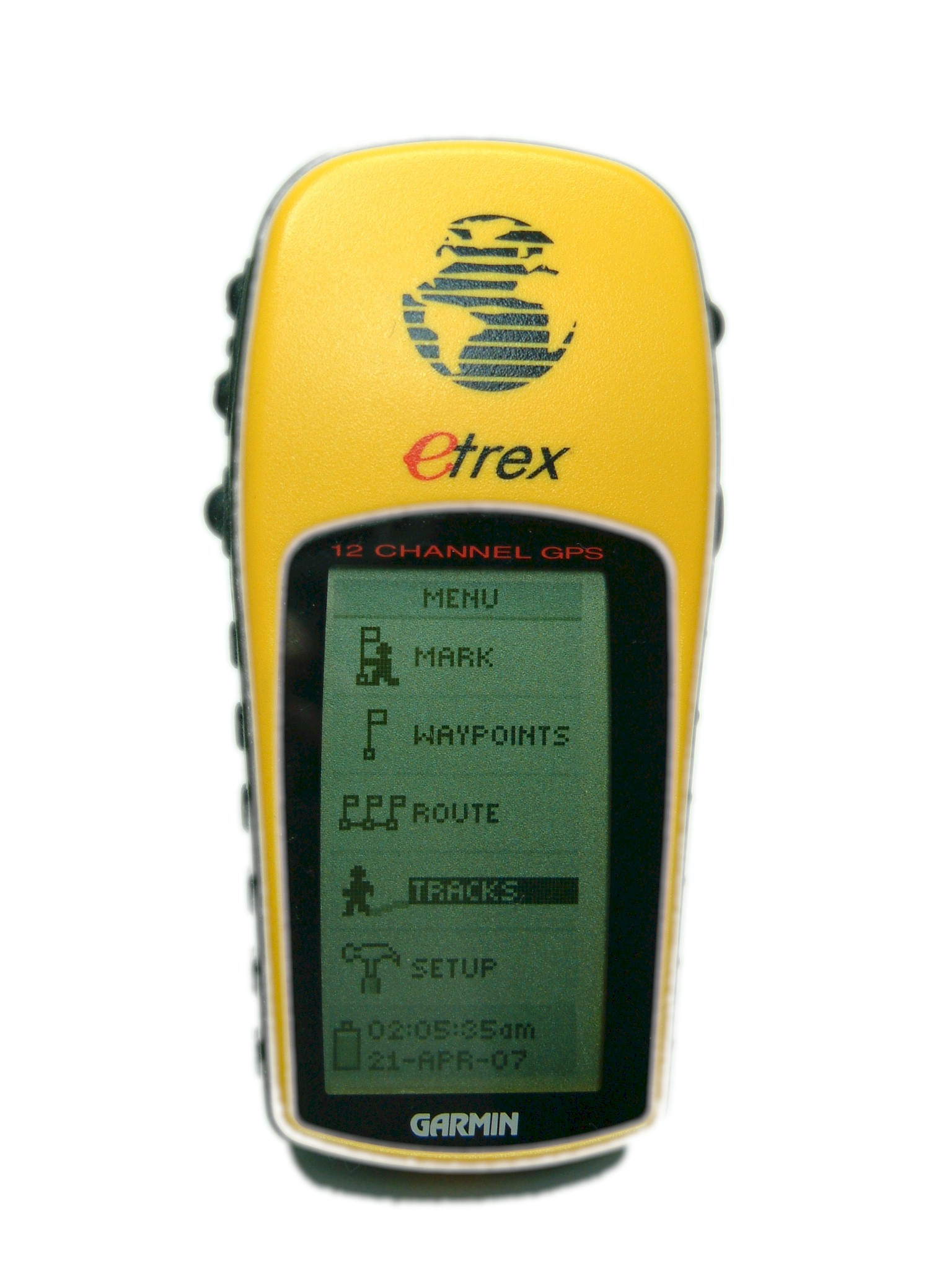
A Garmin eTrex H, an early, basic GPS model

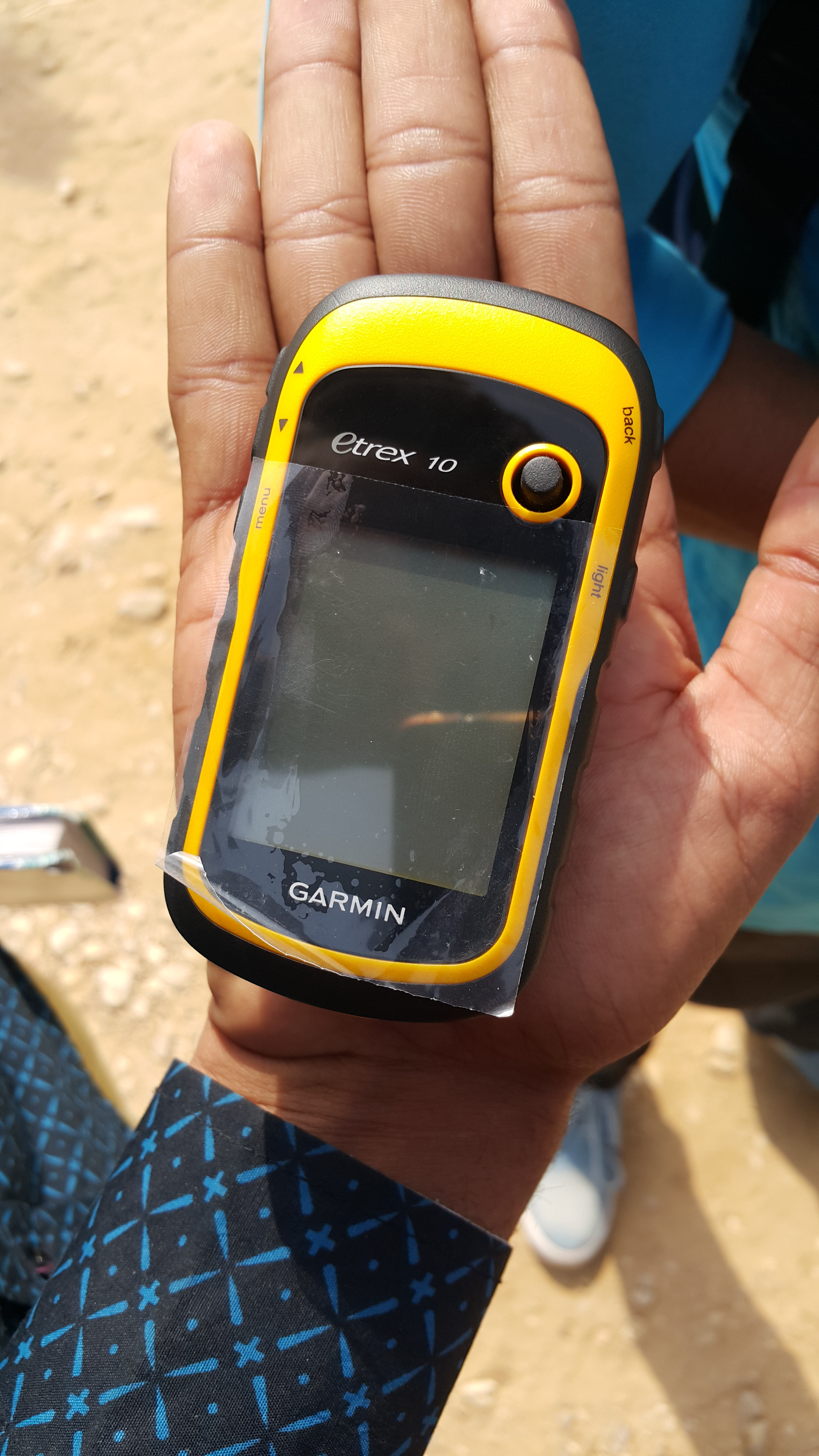
Garmin eTrex10 Handheld

The compact eTrex was introduced in 2000; several models with different features have been released since. The original eTrex, commonly nicknamed "eTrex Yellow", offered a lightweight (5.3 oz/150 g), waterproof, palm-sized 12-channel GPS receiver, along with a battery life of up to 22 hours on two AA-size batteries. It was replaced in 2007 by the eTrex H, which added a high-sensitivity receiver. Other eTrex models include the Summit, Venture, Legend, and Vista, each with various additional features such as WAAS, altimeter, digital compass, city database, and highway maps. Many of these models come in color and expandable-memory versions.

In May 2011 Garmin refreshed the eTrex product line with new mechanical design and support for advances in cartography and hardware technology with its release of the eTrex 10, eTrex 20, and eTrex 30, Garmin became the first company to manufacture and distribute a worldwide consumer navigation product supporting both GPS and GLONASS satellite constellations. On May 13, 2015, Garmin released the eTrex 20x and 30x, which succeeded the eTrex 20 and 30. The main upgrade was a higher resolution screen and 4GB storage, double of the previous models.

On July 2, 2015, Garmin introduced its eTrex Touch line, releasing three models (25, 35 and 35t), all featuring a 2.6" touch screen. The 35t model designation is not used in Europe, but the European market 35 is essentially the 35t, and both the European 25 and 35 include Garmin TopoActive Europe maps and 8GB of internal storage.

eTrex model	10	20	30	20x	30x	Touch 25	Touch 35	Touch 35t	Touch 25 (EU)	Touch 35 (EU)
Release date	May 2011			May 2015		July 2015				
Release price	$120	$200	$300	$200	$300	$250	$300	$350	€249	€299
Production state	In Production	Discontinued		In Production						
Satellite systems	GPS & GLONASS (with WAAS & HotFix)									
Compass	No		Yes	No	Yes	Yes	Yes			
Barometer	No		Yes	No	Yes	No	Yes			
Screen size, resolution, color & touch	2.2"					2.6"				
Screen size, resolution, color & touch	128×160	176×220		240×320		160×240				
Screen size, resolution, color & touch	Monochrome	65k color								
Screen size, resolution, color & touch	No					Yes				
Memory	-	2GB		4GB				8GB		
Preloaded maps	Basemap	Relief Basemap						TOPO 100K	TopoActive Europe	
Other features	IPX7 waterproof, 2× AA battery, USB interface, geocaching friendly.									
Other features	-	MicroSD storage, automatic routing, add custom maps.								
Model	10	20	30	20x	30x	Touch 25	Touch 35	Touch 35t	Touch 25	Touch 35

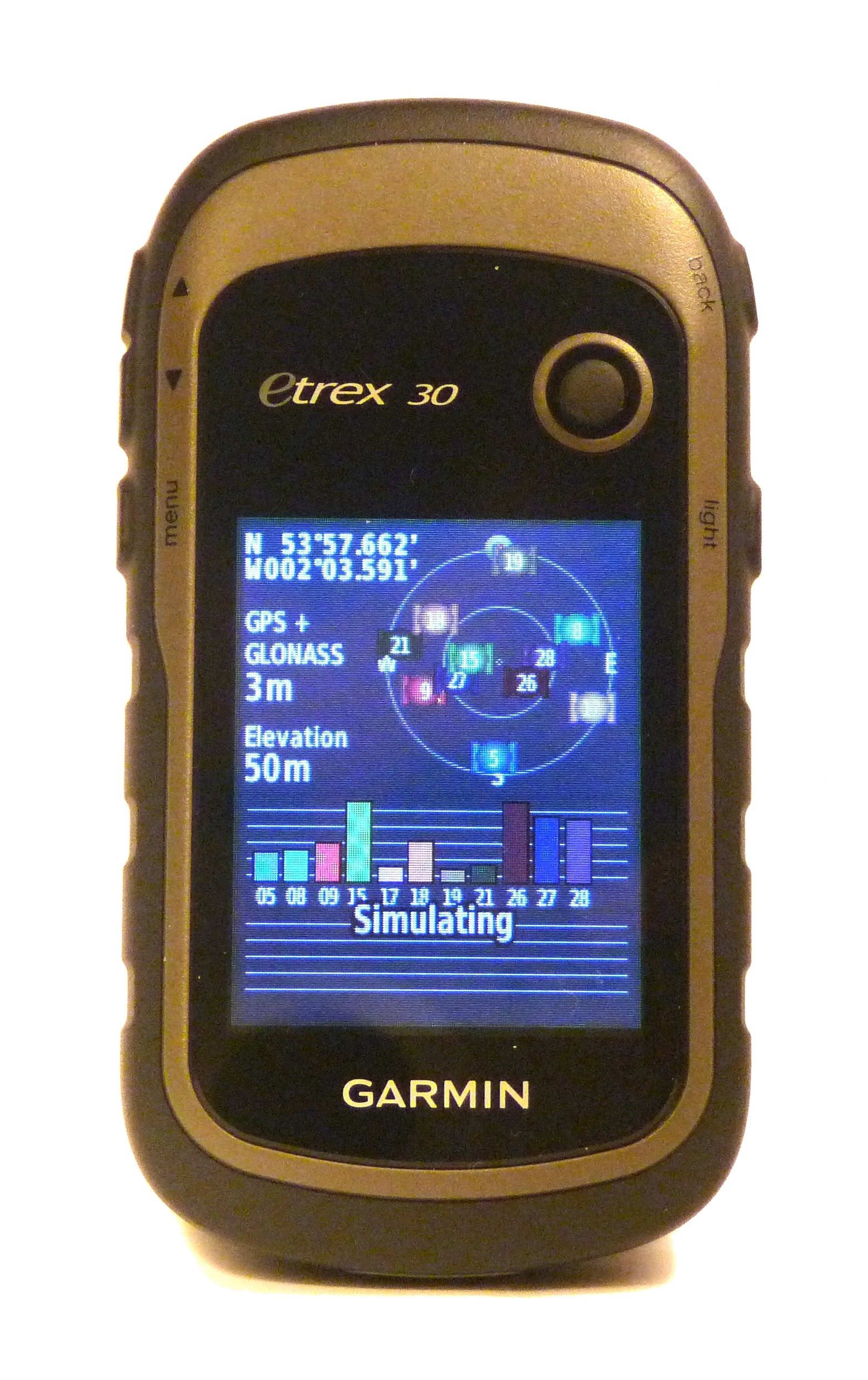
A Garmin eTrex 30 simultaneously connects to both GPS and GLONASS satellites.

The Geko series was a compact line of handheld GPS receivers aimed at the budget or lightweight hiking market.

Another early product, a handheld GPS receiver, was sold to US military personnel serving in Kuwait and Saudi Arabia during the 1991 Gulf War.

The Garmin Foretrex is a similar wrist-worn GNNS device with two-dimensional GPS tracking and waypoint projection called.

In 2004, Garmin introduced its 60C line of handheld GPS mapping receivers, featuring increased sensitivity and storage capacity along with a battery life of up to 30 hours in battery-save mode. This was followed by the 60Cx and 60CSx with improved color map displays.

With the GTM-11, GTM 20 and GTM 25, a Garmin GPS device receives and uses traffic message channel (TMC) information. Also, some Garmin nüvi (1690, 1490T, 1450T, 1390T, 1390, 1350, 1260, 1250 and 265WT, 265T, 265W, 265, 255w and 255) comes with an integrated TMC receiver.

The Fenix range, such as the Fenix 6 released in August 2019, is a more rugged, multisport range that also offers a solar charging model.

Other series include the Quatix aimed at water sports, the D2 aviator watches, the Approach golf watches.

In 2018, Garmin added support for maps, Bluetooth music playback, NFC contactless payment (using a digital wallet branded Garmin Pay), and pulse-oximetry for its wristwear.

Garmin produces a line of dog trackers and trainers under the Astro and Alpha brands.

=== Nüvifone ===
In early 2009, Garmin announced it would be manufacturing a location-specific cellular telephone in cooperation with Asus. Called the Garmin-Asus nüvifone G60, the United States release on AT&T was scheduled for October 4, 2009. Four other models in this line have since been released: two Windows Mobile-powered models for the European and Asian market, and two Android models, one for the Europe/Asia market and another for T-Mobile USA.

=== Marine ===
Garmin manufactures a number of recreational marine electronics with products that include chartplotters and multifunction displays, cartography, fishfinders, SONAR, Autopilot Systems, RADAR, VHF communication radios, and handheld wearable devices.

A few select products in this category include Livescope, Chartplotters, Force Trolling Motor, Navionics, and Garmin’s marine audio products Fusion and JL Audio.

The company's first product was the GPS 100, a panel-mounted GPS receiver aimed at the marine market, priced at $2,500. It made its debut at the 1990 International Marine Technology Exposition in Chicago.

Garmin also manufactures a line of sonar fishfinders, including some units that also have GPS capability, and some that use spread spectrum technology.

=== Automotive OEM (Original Equipment Manufacturer) ===
Garmin has relationships with several leading automobile manufacturers to provide a variety of hardware and software solutions for their vehicles. This includes BMW Group, Mercedes-Benz, Honda, Daimler, Ford, Chrysler, Toyota, PSA/Citroen, Geely, Honda Motorcycle, Kawasaki, BMW Motorrad, Aston Martin, and Yamaha Motor.

The product categories Garmin manufactures include domain controllers, infotainment units, map databases, and cameras.

=== Aviation ===
Garmin designs, manufactures, and markets a number of aircraft avionics products, systems, and services. These include: integrated flight decks, electronic flight displays and instrumentation, navigation and communication products, automatic flight control systems and safety-enhancing technologies, audio control systems, engine indication systems, traffic awareness and avoidance solutions, ads-b and transponders, weather information and avoidance solutions, and datalink and connectivity.

A few select products in this category include G1000, Autoland, Garmin PlaneSync, Runway Occupancy Awareness, and GTN Touchscreen avionics.

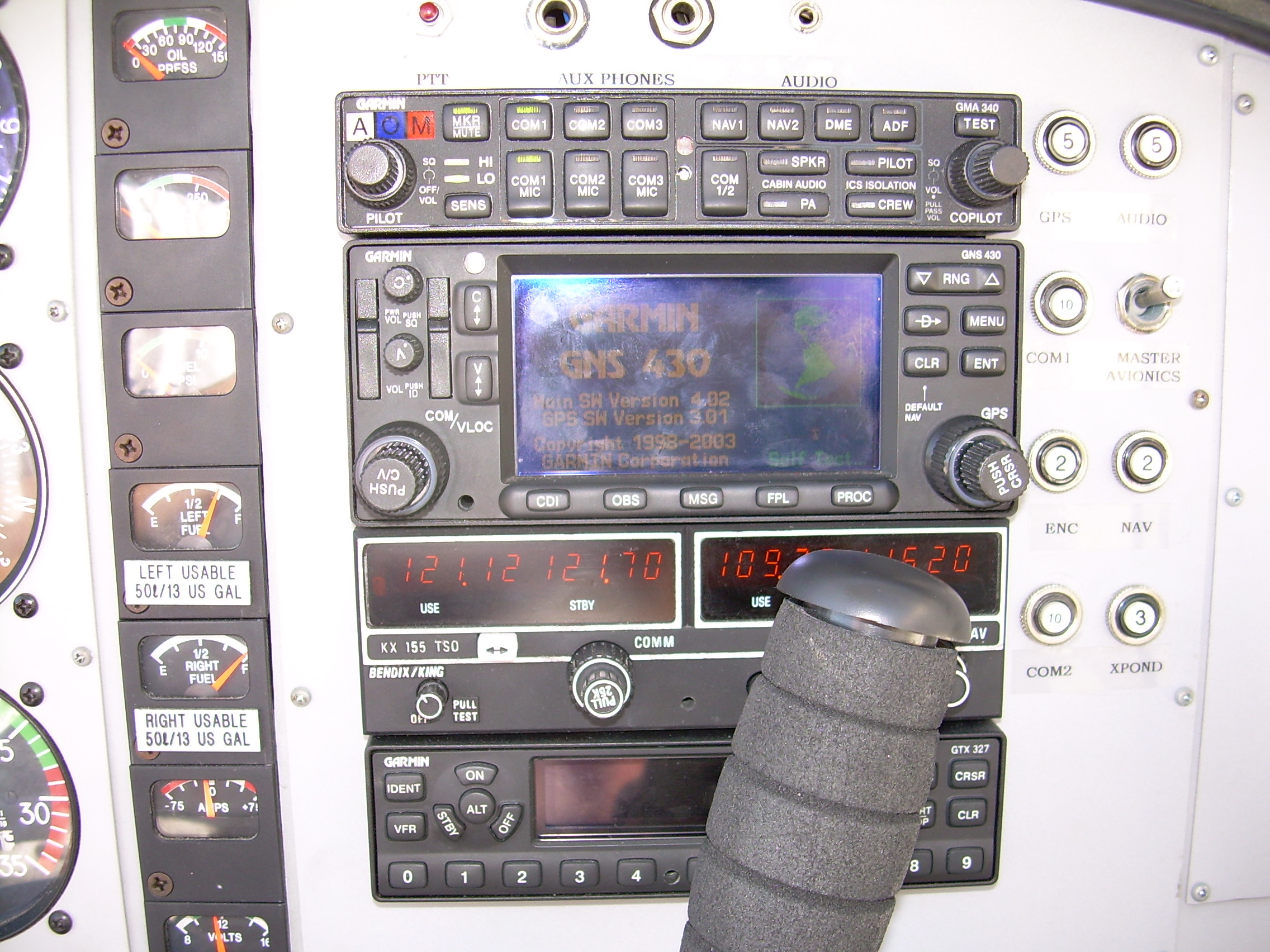
GMA340 Audio control, GNS430 Nav/Com and GTX327 transponder in a light aircraft

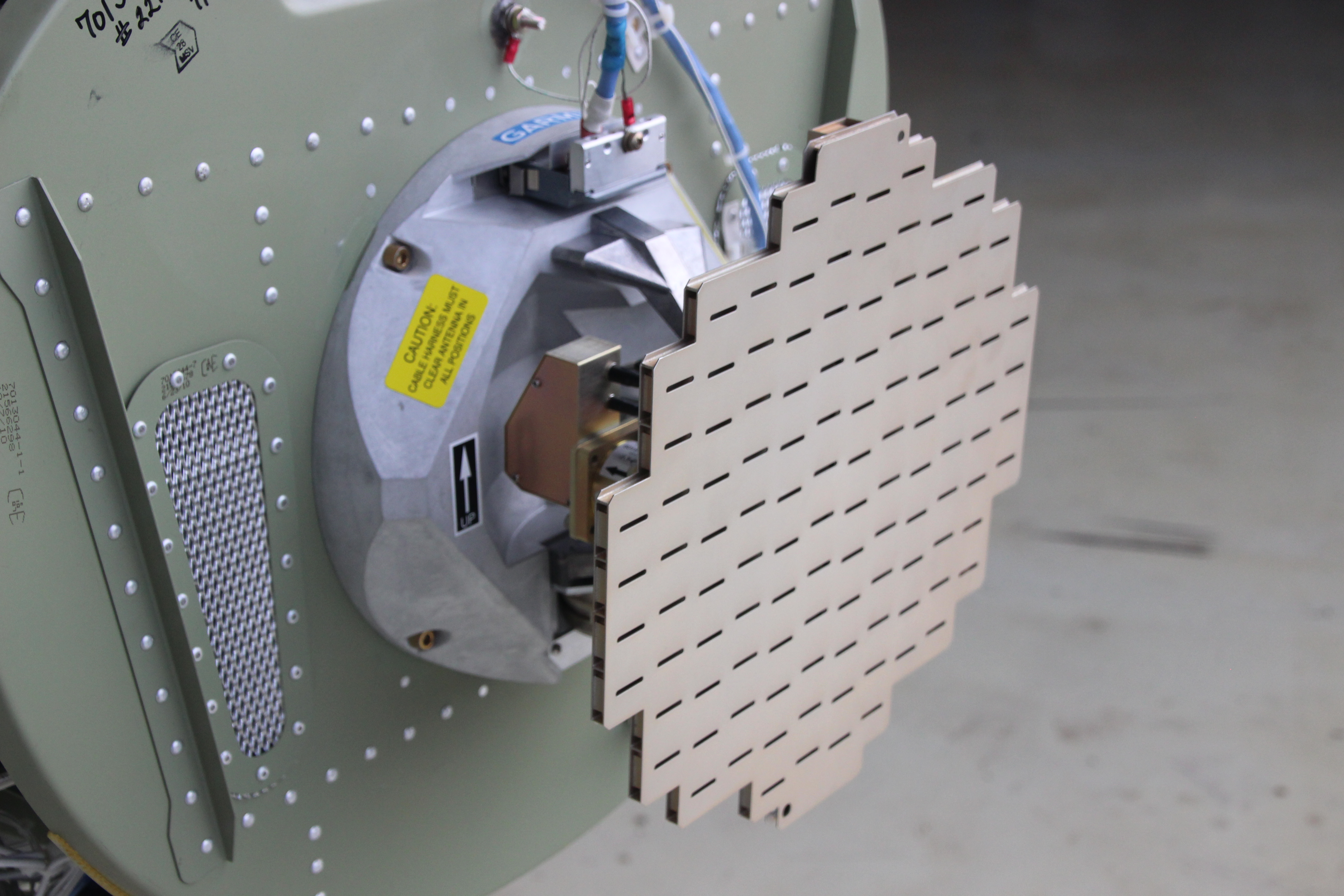
GWX 68 weather radar

==== United Parcel Service AT (Aviation Technologies) ====
In 2003, Garmin acquired UPS Aviation Technologies, including that firm's II Morrow Apollo line of aircraft MFD/GPS/NAV/COMM units. II Morrow had been founded in Salem, Oregon in 1982 as a manufacturer of LORAN C marine and general aviation products. In 1982 its aircraft navigator 602 LORAN C receiver permitted point to point navigation. Some examples of its LORAN units are Apollo II 616B Aviation LORAN panel mount (1986), II Morrow Apollo 604 Loran Navigator (1987) and Apollo 820 GPS Flybuddy (1991). In 1986, United Parcel Service (UPS) purchased the company to expand the use of electronic technology in the package delivery and tracking business.

II Morrow shifted focus from marine business to development of package process automation technology for UPS such as vehicle management systems, automated high speed package sorting systems, as well as delivery and tracking systems. In 1999, II Morrow was renamed to UPS Aviation Technologies, and re-focused towards modernizing UPS' Boeing 7xx series Heavy Iron Transport Category Aircraft fleet, as well it also re-entered the general aviation marketplace. It certified the first Gamma 3 WAAS GPS engine for FAA Certified Precision GPS approaches. The new certified WAAS engine yielded vertical and horizontal accuracy of one meter RMS in guidance into airports without existing ILS approaches. This GPS technology met the FAA's TSO-C146a primary navigation standards for en route, terminal and approach phases of flight—with WAAS augmentation as the sole means of navigation. This primary GPS "sole source" navigation capability was integrated into the CNX-80. The CNX-80 WAAS GPS/COM/NAV integrated navigator was the first product in the industry approved for primary GPS navigation. It also enabled LPV glideslope approaches without requiring ground nav aids. New LNAV (GPS) approaches provide the accuracy and safety of an ILS—without the ground-based localizer and glideslope equipment. Later, the CNX-80 was renamed the GNS-480, under Garmin.

In 1999: Flight International magazine presented UPS Aviation Technologies with its Aerospace Industry Award for the development of ADS-B, a surveillance technology intended to reduce aviation delays while improving safety.

Garmin Aviation offers electronically integrated cockpits for aircraft: panel mount displays, primary flight displays (PFD) and multi-function displays (MFD), transponders, radar, and other types of avionic systems. Garmin entered this market in 1991 with the GPS-100AVD panel-mounted receiver. Its first portable unit, the GPS-95, was introduced in 1993. In 1994, the GPS-155 panel-mounted unit was the first GPS receiver on the market to receive full FAA certification for instrument approaches. In 1998, Garmin introduced the GNS-430, an integrated GPS navigation receiver/communications transceiver. That same year, the company rolled out its first integrated GPS, COM, VOR, LOC and glideslope product, the GNS 430. More than 125,000 GNS navigators are now installed in aircraft. Garmin reached its one millionth delivery in November 2017.

The G1000 is an all-glass avionics suite for OEM aircraft, the similar G950 is used in experimental aircraft, and the G600 is a retrofit.

On October 30, 2019, Garmin announced that the Piper M600 and Cirrus Vision Jet would become the first general aviation aircraft certified with the company's emergency autoland system, which is capable of automatically landing the aircraft with the push of a button and will be a part of both aircraft's G3000 integrated avionics suite in 2020. Garmin calls the new technology "Autonomí". Garmin plans to equip other platforms in 2020, like the TBM 940, and hopes to eventually expand its offer to the G1000 avionics suite. In June 2021, Garmin Autoland won the 2020 Collier Trophy.

=== Laptop GPS and mobile apps ===
In April 2008, Garmin launched Garmin Mobile PC, a GPS navigation software program for laptop PCs and other computers, based on the Microsoft Windows operating system, now discontinued.

Garmin offers mobile apps for various purposes for Android, Windows Phone, and for iPhone.

== Sport sponsorship ==
In 2007 Garmin began sponsorship of English Premier League football club Middlesbrough in a one-year deal that was carried into a second year for the 2008/09 season. In 2008 Garmin began sponsorship of cycling team Garmin–Chipotle p/b H30 to promote its Edge line of bicycle computers. In 2015, the team became Cannondale–Garmin. In 2014 Garmin paired up with Premier League side Southampton FC in a global partnership. Garmin's European head office is located in Southampton.

== See also ==
- Automotive navigation system
- Comparison of commercial GPS software
- Garmin–Sharp
- Geotab
