= King Radio (company) =

Avionics company

King Radio Corporation
- Industry: Avionics
- Founded: 1959
- Founder: Ed King
- Defunct: 1983
- Fate: Acquired by Bendix. Bendix then acquired by AlliedSignal who later merged with Honeywell
- Parent: Honeywell

King Radio Corporation was an avionics company started by Ed King, Jr (1921–2012). King was an engineering student at Kansas State University. In 1948 he founded his first company manufacturing components for Arthur A. Collins of Collins Radio. After selling his first venture in 1959, King founded King Radio in a rural area outside Kansas City. The company was moved shortly after its formation to a plant in Olathe, Kansas. It was later purchased by Allied Corporation and merged with Bendix Corporation in 1985 to form Bendix/King. Today it is part of Honeywell International Inc.

== Products ==
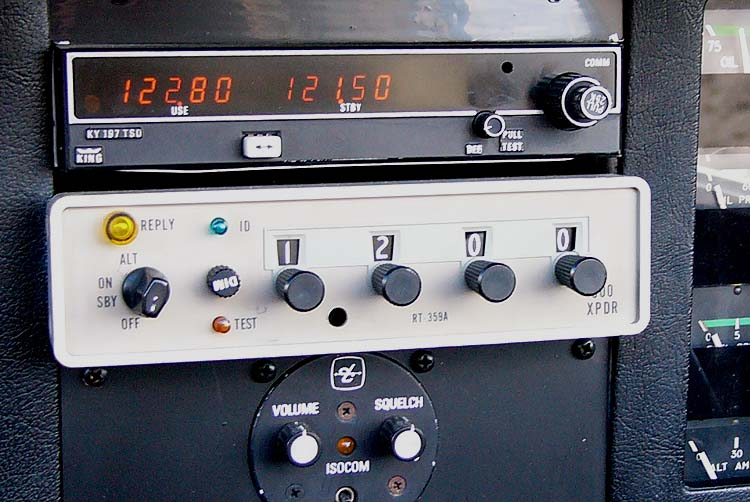
A King KY197 Comm radio (top) in a Yankee panel

King Radio was a manufacturer of general aviation avionics and aviation gauges and indicators. It was a major avionics supplier of Cessna, Piper, and Beechcraft.

The success of King Radio began with the highly popular KY 90 VHF communications radio, known for its clarity and low cost. Over the years King Radio produced many hits such as the KDF 800 Automatic Direction Finder and the KX 155 Navigation/Communication radio. Many of these products can still be found on aircraft flying today. In 1970 King Radio released the KX 175 the first low cost all solid state VHF navigation and communications unit with TSO design approval, which was the first affordable general aviation digitally synthesized radio, which together with its derivatives, the KX170B and KX 175B, became what is known as the most reliable radio of its times, for use in general aviation.

== Acquisition ==
In 1983, King Radio was acquired by the Allied Corporation, which also purchased Bendix Aviation that same year. The combined company was called Bendix/King. Allied Corporation merged with the Signal Companies in 1985 to form AlliedSignal. That company later merged with Honeywell, and retained the use of the Honeywell name.

The BendixKing brand has remained popular with aviation enthusiasts, and both AlliedSignal and Honeywell have used the brand on their general aviation products to this day.
