= List of online map services =

Online maps can be basically divided by the covered area (global or local) and by the representation of this area (classic drawn or orthophoto).

== Global online map service provider and their map Service ==
These maps cover the world, but may have close up details in many areas.

- Apple
  - Apple Maps
- Altair Guide
- Esri
- Fosm.org
- Alphabet
  - Google Maps
  - Google Earth
  - Waze
- Here
  - Here WeGo
- Microsoft
  - Azure Maps
  - Bing Maps
- MapsLore
- OpenStreetMap
  - Mapbox
  - MapQuest
  - Mapcreator
  - Maptitude Online
  - Mapy.com
  - Moovit
  - Stadia Maps
  - Thunderforest Maps
- Seznam
  - Mapy.com
- TomTom
  - Bing Maps
  - Petal Maps
  - Windows Maps
- WikiMapia
- Yahoo! Maps (defunct)
- Yandex Maps

== By continent ==
=== Africa ===
- Africomaps - Covers all 54 countries in the African continent

=== Europe ===
- ViaMichelin (based on TomTom)

== Local online maps ==
Local maps cover only part of the earth surface, and may be more detailed than the global ones.

=== Abkhazia ===
- 2GIS, by 2GIS.

=== Australia ===
- "The Australian National Map", by TerriaJS.
- "MinView", by NSW Government
- "Whereis", by Sensis

=== Azerbaijan ===
- "GoMap.Az", by the Government of Azerbaijan.

=== Bangladesh ===
- "Barikoi" - covers Bangladesh, specially Dhaka city and parts of Narayanganj in detail, more cities will be covered soon

=== Bahrain ===
- "Bahrain Locator", by the Government of Bahrain.
- Urbi, by 2GIS.

=== Belarus ===
- 2GIS, by 2GIS.

=== Belgium ===
- geo.be - Geoportal of the Belgian federal institutions
- datastore.brussels - covers the Brussels Region
- Geopunt - covers the Flemish Region and offers all data as open data downloads and services
- WalOnMap - covers the Walloon Region

=== Caribbean ===
- Staff writers (September 15, 2016). "Skyviews: Islands Hotspots Caribbean Map Publishers". www.skyviews.com. One Bright Space. Skyviews Island Hotspots.

=== China ===
- AutoNavi (Gaode).
- "Baidu Maps", by Baidu.
- "Tencent Maps", by Tencent.
- Sogou Map by Sogou
- "Tianditu", by China's State Bureau of Surveying and Mapping.

=== Czech Republic ===
- Mapy.com, by Seznam.cz; uses OpenStreetMap for other countries

=== Egypt ===
- "NARSS Geoportal", by the National Authority for Remote Sensing and Space Sciences.

=== Estonia ===
- Estonian Land Board - covers the whole country

=== European Union ===
- "INSPIRE Geoportal", by the European Commission.

=== France ===
- Géoportail - government run public service mapping, covers the whole French territory and Monaco.
- ViaMichelin - World maps, city maps, driving directions, Michelin-starred restaurants, hotel booking, traffic news and weather forecast with ViaMichelin.

=== Germany ===
- "Geoportal.de", by the Federal Agency for Cartography and Geodesy (BKG).

=== Hong Kong ===
- Centamap – launched in 1999, Centamap is built using data from the Hong Kong Government
- GeoInfo Map – a geospatial information service provided by the Hong Kong Special Administrative Region (HKSAR) Government.
- Common Spatial Data Infrastructure Portal aka CSDI – a portal providing information infrastructure to share spatial data in Hong Kong for smart city development.

=== India ===
- "Bhuvan", by National Remote Sensing Centre, ISRO
- "Mappls", by MapMyIndia

=== Indonesia ===
- "Ina-Geoportal", by Badan Informasi Geospasial.

=== Iran ===
- Neshan
- namaa
- Balad

=== Israel ===
- "Walla! Maps", by Walla!.

=== Japan ===
- "Yahoo! Japan Maps", by Yahoo! Japan.
- "MapFan", by Increment P.

=== Kazakhstan ===
- 2GIS, by 2GIS.

=== Kuwait ===
- "Kuwait Finder", by Kuwait's Public Authority for Civil Information.
- Urbi, by 2GIS.

=== Kyrghyzstan ===
- 2GIS, by 2GIS.

=== Malaysia ===
- "1Malaysia Map", by the Ministry of Water, Land and Natural Resources (Malaysia).

=== Malta ===
- "Geoserver map portal", by the Planning Authority.

=== Myanmar ===
- "DPS Map", covers Myanmar/Burma.

=== Nepal ===
- Baato Maps

=== New Zealand ===
- "NZGB Gazetteer", by Land Information New Zealand.

=== Nigeria ===
- Lagos State: Lagos State Spatial Data Infrastructure

=== Oman ===
- "National Survey Authority Geoportal", by Oman's National Survey Authority.

=== Palestine ===
- "GeoMOLG", by the Government of Palestine.

=== Philippines ===
- "Philippine Geoportal", by the National Mapping and Resource Information Authority.

=== Qatar ===
- "Qatar Geoportal", by Qatar's Center for Geographic Information Systems (CGIS), part of the Ministry of Municipality and Environment.
- Urbi, by 2GIS.

=== Russia ===
- Yandex Maps, by Yandex.
- 2GIS, by 2GIS.
- Maps.me, by Mail.Ru

=== Saudi Arabia ===
- "GeoPortal Saudia", by the General Commission for Survey (GCS).
- Urbi, by 2GIS.

=== Serbia ===
- "Geosrbija", by the Republic Geodetic Authority.

=== Singapore ===
- "OneMap", by the Singapore Land Authority.

=== Slovenia ===
- GeaBios

=== South Africa ===
- "AfriGIS Maps", by AfriGIS.

=== South Korea ===
- "Daum Map", by Daum (web portal).
- "Naver Maps", by Naver.
- T Map by SK Telecom
- One Navi by KT corporation

=== Spain ===
- Spanish official cartography website, including National Topographic Maps MTN50 (1:50,000 scale) and MTN25 (1:25,000 scale).
- SITPA-IDEAS, Asturias regional maps.

=== Sweden ===
- Eniro.se, also covers Denmark, Finland and Norway
- Hitta.se

=== Switzerland ===
- map.geo.admin.ch by the Swiss Federal Office of Topography (Swisstopo). Also covers Liechtenstein.
- search.ch/map by search.ch

=== Thailand ===
- "Longdo Map", by Longdo.
- "NOSTRA Map", by Globetech.

=== Turkey ===
- "Gezgin Geoportal", by the Scientific and Technological Research Council of Turkey.

=== United Arab Emirates ===
- "Abu Dhabi Geospatial Portal", an initiative of the Abu Dhabi Spatial Data Infrastructure (AD-SDI) program by the Abu Dhabi Smart Solutions & Services Authority.
- "Makani", by Dubai Municipality's Geographic Information Systems Department.
- Urbi, by 2GIS.

=== United Kingdom ===
- Digimap
- "OS Maps", by Ordnance Survey.
- OpenStreetMap - covers the whole country
- "StreetMap", by Streetmap EU Ltd, at streetmap.co.uk - covers the whole country

=== United States ===
- Apple Maps - covers the whole country
- Bing Maps – covers the whole country
- Google Maps - covers the whole country
- Libre Map Project
- MapQuest - covers the whole country
- The National Map by the United States Geological Survey.
- Roadtrippers - covers the whole country
- TerraServer-USA - covers the whole country

=== Uzbekistan ===
- 2GIS, by 2GIS.

=== Vietnam ===
- "Vietbando Maps", by Vietbando.
- "Vinalo Maps", Vinalo.

== See also ==
- Comparison of web map services
- National mapping agency
