= Comparison of web map services =

Feature	Google Maps	Bing Maps	MapQuest	Mapy.com	OpenStreetMap	Here WeGo	Apple Maps	Yandex Maps	2GIS / Urbi
License	Proprietary	Proprietary	Proprietary	Proprietary	ODbL	Proprietary	Proprietary	Proprietary	Proprietary
Availability
Full extra functionality	Australia, Canada, France, Germany, Israel, Italy, Netherlands, Spain, UK, United States.	Andorra, Australia, Austria, Bahrain, Belgium, Canada, Croatia, Czech Republic, Denmark, Finland, France, Germany, Gibraltar, Guernsey, Hong Kong SAR, Hungary, Iceland, Ireland, Isle of Man, Italy, Japan, Jersey, Jordan, Kuwait, Liechtenstein, Luxembourg, Malaysia, Monaco, Netherlands, New Zealand, Norway, Oman, Portugal, Puerto Rico, Qatar, Romania, San Marino, Saudi Arabia, Singapore, South Africa, Spain, Sweden, Switzerland, Taiwan, United Arab Emirates, United Kingdom, United States, Vatican City	United States	Czech Republic	All	More than 180 navigable countries	Austria, Belgium, Canada, Denmark, France, Germany, Ireland, Italy, Netherlands, Norway, Spain, Sweden, Switzerland, UK, USA	All	Russia (included Crimea), Kazakhstan, Abkhazia, Ukraine (in past), Saudi Arabia, UAE, Oman
Limited extra functionality	Andorra, Austria, Belgium, Brazil, China, Croatia, Czech Republic, Denmark, Finland, Gibraltar, Greece, Hong Kong, Hungary, Ireland, Liechtenstein, Luxembourg, Monaco, New Zealand, Norway, Poland, Portugal, Russia (Moscow only), San Marino, Singapore, Slovakia, Slovenia, South Africa, Sweden, Switzerland, Turkey (Istanbul only)	Bahamas, Cayman Islands, China, Macao SAR, Malta, Virgin Islands			No limited functionality	Voice guided navigation for both pedestrians and drivers for 74 countries in 46 different languages	Argentina, Australia, Austria, Belgium, Brazil, Canada, Chile, China, Colombia, Croatia, Czech Republic, Denmark, Egypt, Finland, France, Germany, Hungary, India, Indonesia, Ireland, Israel, Italy, Jamaica, Japan, Luxembourg, Macau, Malaysia, Mexico, Netherlands, New Zealand, Norway, Peru, Philippines, Poland, Portugal, Russia, Singapore, South Africa, South Korea, Spain, Sweden, Switzerland, Taiwan, Thailand, Turkey, UK, USA, Venezuela, Vietnam		Kyrghyzstan, Uzbekistan, Georgia, Azerbaijan, Armenia, Belarus, Italy (Padova only), Chile (Santiago only), Egypt (New Cairo only)
Directory listings	Australia, Belgium, Canada, China, Japan, Finland, France, Germany, Hong Kong, Ireland, Italy, the Netherlands, Norway, Singapore, South Africa, Spain, Taiwan, the UK, and the United States	Global			None		Argentina, Australia, Austria, Belgium, Brazil, Canada, Chile, China, Colombia, Croatia, Czech Republic, Denmark, Egypt, Finland, France, Germany, Hong Kong, Hungary, India, Indonesia, Ireland, Israel, Italy, Jamaica, Japan, Luxembourg, Macau, Malaysia, Mexico, Netherlands, New Zealand, Norway, Peru, Philippines, Poland, Portugal, Russia, Singapore, South Africa, South Korea, Spain, Sweden, Switzerland, Taiwan, Thailand, Turkey, UK, USA, Venezuela, Vietnam	None	
Officially supported web browsers	IE7+, Firefox 2.0.0.8+, Safari 3+, Mozilla 1.7+, Opera 8.02+, Google Chrome 1+	IE7+, Firefox 3.6+, Safari 5+, Google Chrome, Mobile Browsers (Internet Explorer, Apple iPhone, Google Android, Research in Motion (RIM) BlackBerry Browser)	IE10, IE11, Chrome, Firefox, Safari (g+)	MS Edge, Chrome, Firefox, Safari, Opera, Seznam.cz (all latest or 1-2 previous versions)	IE7+, Mozilla Firefox 3.5+, Google Chrome 4+, Safari 4+	IE7+, Mozilla Firefox 3.5+, Google Chrome 4+, Safari 4+	None, application-dependent	Internet Explorer 9+, Firefox 2.0.0.8+, Mozilla 1.7+, Opera 8.02+, Google Chrome 1+	IE9+, Firefox 2.0.0.8+, Safari 3+, Mozilla 1.7+, Opera 8.02+, Google Chrome 1+
Officially supported interface languages	74 languages: Afrikaans, Azerbaijani, Indonesian, Malay, Bosnian, Catalan, Czech, Danish, German (Germany), Estonian, English (United States), Spanish (Spain), Spanish (Latin America), Basque, Filipino, French (France), Galician, Croatian, Zulu, Icelandic, Italian, Swahili, Latvian, Lithuanian, Hungarian, Dutch, Norwegian, Uzbek, Polish, Portuguese (Brazil), Portuguese (Portugal), Romanian, Albanian, Slovak, Slovenian, Finnish, Swedish, Vietnamese, Turkish, Greek, Bulgarian, Kyrgyz, Kazakh, Macedonian, Mongolian, Russian, Serbian, Ukrainian, Georgian, Armenian, Hebrew, Urdu, Arabic, Persian, Amharic, Nepali, Hindi, Marathi, Bengali, Punjabi, Gujarati, Tamil, Telugu, Kannada, Malayalam, Sinhala, Thai, Lao, Burmese, Khmer, Korean, Japanese, Simplified Chinese, Traditional Chinese	117 languages	Dansk, Deutsch, Dutch, English, French, Italian, Norwegian, Portuguese, Spanish, Swedish	Czech, English, German, Italian, Polish, Russian, Slovak, Ukrainian	50+ website translations, unlimited map languages	30 including English, Croatian, Czech, Danish, Finnish, French, German, Greek, Hindi, Hungarian, Icelandic, Indonesian, Italian, Korean, Polish, Portuguese (Brazil), Portuguese, Romanian, Russian, Slovak, Spanish, Swedish, Thai, Turkish	33 languages: English, Arabic, Catalan, Croatian, Czech, Danish, Dutch, Finnish, French, German, Greek, Hebrew, Hindi, Hungarian, Indonesian, Italian, Japanese, Korean, Malay, Norwegian Bokmål, Polish, Portuguese, Romanian, Russian, Simplified Chinese, Slovak, Spanish, Swedish, Thai, Traditional Chinese, Turkish, Ukrainian, Vietnamese	English, Russian, Ukrainian, Turkish	Russian, Ukrainian (in past), Kazakh, Abkhazian, Arabic, Georgian, Armenian
Viewing interface
Feature	Google Maps	Bing Maps	MapQuest	Mapy.com	OpenStreetMap	Here WeGo	Apple Maps	Yandex Maps	2GIS / Urbi
Degrees of motion	Vertical, horizontal, depth, rotation (beta), 360 panoramic (Street View), 3D mode (Google Earth JavaScript)	Vertical, horizontal, depth, 360 panoramic (Streetside), 3D mode (tilt, pan, rotate)	Vertical, horizontal, depth	Vertical, horizontal, depth, 360 panoramic (Panorama), 3D mode (tilt, pan, rotate)	Vertical, horizontal, depth	Vertical, horizontal, depth (zoom), Tilt (3D), rotate 360 degrees	Vertical, horizontal, depth, rotate 360 degrees, 3D	Vertical, horizontal, depth, rotation (mobile version), 360 panoramic, 3D mode	Vertical, horizontal, depth, rotation, 3D mode
Map zoom	22 (more levels available through parameter)	19-22 (depending on which map control is used)	17	19	19	18	Vector-base	19	20
Mouse scroll wheel map zoom	Yes	Yes	Yes	Yes	Yes	Yes	Yes	Yes	Yes
Direct mouse interface (draggable, etc.)	Yes	Yes	Yes	Yes	Yes	Yes	Yes	Yes	Yes
Dynamic search results based on dragging on the map	Yes	Yes	No	Yes	No	Yes	No	Yes	Yes
Keyboard shortcuts	Yes	Yes	No	No	Yes	Yes - routing with directions	Yes	No	No
Map types	6: map with traffic data (separate transit and bicycle view), satellite with traffic data (3D LiDar for certain places not present in most places), hybrid	9: road, satellite, hybrid, bird's eye, traffic, 3D, London street map, ordnance survey map, venue map	3: road, satellite, traffic	8: standard, traffic, outdoor, with photos, satellite, winter, geographic, haptic	5: standard map, transport map, cycle map, humanitarian	7: map view, satellite, terrain, 3D, traffic, public transportation, heat map, map creator, explore places, community	4: explore, standard, hybrid, satellite; all include a traffic data layer	5: standard, hybrid, satellite, traffic, 3D	14: standard, traffic, outdoor, winter, realty, friends, public transportation, parking, currency exchange, touristic, traffic accident heat map, photos, 3D, immersive roads
3D mode	Yes, limited to certain areas	Yes (Windows 8/10)	No	Yes	Yes, third-party	Yes, limited to certain areas	Yes	Yes (mobile version)	Yes
3D landmarks	Yes	Yes	No	No	No	Yes	Yes	Yes	Yes
Weather	No		No	Yes	Yes, third-party	Yes	Yes	No	Yes
Backend	JSON	JSON, XML, JavaScript, .NET			XML	Java, JavaScript			Java, JavaScript
Backend providers	Google	Microsoft		Seznam.cz	OpenStreetMap Foundation. Paid for by various individuals and companies.	HERE	Apple	Yandex	2GIS
Data
Feature	Google Maps	Bing Maps	MapQuest	Mapy.com	OpenStreetMap	Here WeGo	Apple Maps	Yandex Maps	2GIS / Urbi
Age of satellite imagery	1–3 years	1–3 years	1–4 years		No	1–3 years	1–3 years	1–4 years	No
Map data providers	MAPIT, Tele Atlas, DigitalGlobe, MDA Federal, user contributions	TomTom, OpenStreetMap, Intermap, Pictometry International, NASA, Blom, Ordnance Survey, SK Planet	TomTom, OpenStreetMap, and others	Seznam.cz, OpenStreetMap and others	User contributions, open data and data donations	HERE	TomTom, and others	user contributions, NAVTEQ and others	OpenStreetMap, JAXA, Global Forest, Navicom, Rosreestr, DigitalGlobe
Directory data providers	Google+, ThomsonLocal.com	Live Local Listings, Yellow Pages, NAVTEQ, Yelp (ratings and reviews), TripAdvisor (ratings and reviews)	Infogroup (contact info, hours, and description), Yelp (ratings, reviews, and "Good to Know")	Seznam.cz and others	OpenStreetMap Nominatim, GeoNames	HERE	Yelp (ratings and reviews), TripAdvisor, others	Yandex.Directory	2GIS
Searching
Feature	Google Maps	Bing Maps	MapQuest	Mapy.com	OpenStreetMap	Here WeGo	Apple Maps	Yandex Maps	2GIS / Urbi
Location	Post code, street name, town, neighborhood, city, plus code (aka OLC) (long and short), long./lat.	Post code, street name, town, neighborhood, city, landmark, administrative district, long./lat.	Post code, street name, town, state, Zip+4	Post code, street name, town, neighborhood/suburb, state/region, city, country, OLC (long and short), Zip+4, long./lat.	Post code, street name, town, neighborhood/suburb, state/region, city, country, Zip+4, long./lat.	Post code, street name, town, neighborhood/suburb, state/region, city, country, long./lat.	Post code, street name, town, neighborhood/suburb, state/region, city, country, Zip+4, long./lat.	Post code, street name, town, neighborhood, city, long./lat.	Post code, street name, town, neighborhood, city, landmark, administrative district, long./lat.
Entity	Business, places of interest, airport codes	Airport code, businesses, collections, directories, landmarks, postal codes	Business, places of interest	Airport code, businesses, landmarks, postal codes, places of interest	All possibility, no restriction	Business, places of interest, landmarks, airport codes	Business, places of interest, airport codes, postal codes	Business, places of interest	Business, places of interest, landmarks, friends on map, airport codes
User created	Yes	Yes	No	Yes	Yes	Yes	No	Yes	No
Levels of filtering	1	0	0		0		0	0	0
Directions
Feature	Google Maps	Bing Maps	MapQuest	Mapy.com	OpenStreetMap	Here WeGo	Apple Maps	Yandex Maps	2GIS / Urbi
Directions	Yes	Yes	Yes	Yes	Yes	Yes – by car, foot, public transport	Yes	Yes	Yes
Reverse directions	Yes	Yes	Yes	Yes	Yes, third-party	Yes	Yes	Yes	Yes
Public transport integration	Yes, limited to certain areas	Yes, limited to certain areas	Yes	Yes, limited to certain areas	Yes, third-party	Yes, limited to certain areas	Yes, not available in certain countries	Yes, limited to certain areas	Yes, limited to certain areas
Walking directions	Yes	Yes	Yes	Yes	Yes	Yes	Yes	Yes	Yes
Wheelchair directions	Yes, accessibility information	No	No	No	Yes, third-party	No	No	No	Yes, accessibility information
Bicycle directions	Yes	No	Yes	Yes	Yes	Yes	Yes	Yes	Yes
Multiple destinations	Yes	Yes	Yes	Yes	Yes, third-party	Yes	Yes, limited to certain types (gas station, cafe)	Yes	Yes
Send to device	Yes, via email	Yes, via email and Cortana (feature coming in Windows 10 anniversary update)	Yes, via email, SMS, Car, GPS, Facebook	Yes, via synchronization, email, Facebook, Twitter, QR, link sharing	No	Yes, via synchronization	Yes, via handoff, link sharing, or airdrop	Yes, via email	Yes
Live traffic information	Yes	Yes (35 countries)	Yes	Yes (9 countries)	Yes, partial in a third-party	Yes	Yes	Yes	Yes
Historic traffic	Yes	No	No		No	Yes	No	Yes	Yes
Personalization
Feature	Google Maps	Bing Maps	MapQuest	Mapy.com	OpenStreetMap	Here WeGo	Apple Maps	Yandex Maps	2GIS / Urbi
Set home location	Yes	Yes	Yes	Yes, if registered	Yes, if registered	Yes	Yes	Yes	Yes
Save maps	Yes	Yes	No	Yes	No	Yes	Yes	Yes	Yes
Printing
Print option	Yes	Yes	Yes	Yes	No	Yes	Yes	Yes	Yes
Scale to print	No	No	No	No	No	No	Yes	Yes	Yes
Crop to print	Yes	Yes	No	No	No	Yes	Yes	Yes	Yes
Notes	Yes	Yes	Yes	Yes	No	Yes	No	Yes	Yes
Retains overlays?	Matched searches, directions	Matches searches, directions, collections	No		Marker	Favourites, directions	Matched searches	Favourites, directions	Favourites, directions
Collaboration / embedding
Create hyperlink	Yes	Yes	Yes	Yes	Yes, both permalink and shortlink	Yes	Yes	Yes	Yes
Send hyperlink to email	Yes	Yes	No	Yes	No	Yes	Yes	No	Yes
Embed HTML Iframe link	Yes	Yes	Yes	Yes	Yes	No	Yes, when sent via iMessage	No	No
Application integration	Google Earth, BMW Assist, Tesla Navigation	Windows 8/10, Windows Phone 7/8/10, Microsoft Office (Access, Outlook, Excel – Power View, Power Maps, Power BI), Microsoft SQL Reporting Services, Microsoft Dynamic CRM, Microsoft SharePoint, Microsoft Cortana, Bing Weather, Microsoft Research WorldWide Telescope, AutoCad, ESRI ArcGIS			OsmAnd, Apple Maps, MapQuest, Foursquare, Craigslist, Apple iPhoto, Wikipedia, World Bank	Mercedes-Benz in-car system, Alpine in-car system	CarPlay	In Car System, Yandex Maps, Yandex.Navigator, Yandex.Transport, Yandex.Schedules	In Car System, 2GIS
API available	Yes	Yes - Javascript, WPF, .NET (C#, VB), C++, Windows 8/10, WP 7/8, REST	Yes	Yes	Yes	Yes	Yes	Yes	Yes
Other		Azure Maps API Maps Blog			Wordpress plugin / open search				
Shareable maps	Yes	Yes Via Email, Facebook, Twitter	No	Yes	Yes	Yes	Yes	No	Yes
Readily available overlays	Yes	Yes	Yes		No	No	No	Yes	Yes
Advertising
Feature	Google Maps	Bing Maps	MapQuest	Mapy.com	OpenStreetMap	Here WeGo	Apple Maps	Yandex Maps	2GIS / Urbi
Business advertising	Yes	Yes - Microsoft consumer apps, not in B2B apps or APIs	No	Yes	No	Yes	No	Yes	Yes
Mobile
Mobile-specific website	Yes	Yes	Yes	Yes	Yes	Yes	No, application dependent	Yes	Yes
Mobile-specific application	Yes	Yes	Yes	Yes	Yes, third-party	Yes, for Nokia mobile phones and iOS and Android	Yes	Yes	Yes
Contact integration	Yes	Yes	No	Yes	No	No	Yes	Yes	Yes
Voice integration	Yes, via Android Maps app, upcoming feature for full web mode	Yes	No	Yes	Yes, with OsmAnd	Yes	Yes	Yes	Yes
GPS integration	Yes	Yes	Yes	Yes	Yes	Yes	Yes	Yes	Yes
Directions	Yes	Yes	Yes - with OsmAnd	Yes	Yes		Yes	Yes	Yes
Turn-by-turn navigation	Yes, if on Android	Yes - Windows 10	Yes	Yes	Yes, with OsmAnd	Yes	Yes	Yes, if on mobile version	Yes, if on mobile version
Interactive maps	Yes	Yes	Yes	Yes	Yes, in custom implementations e.g. via STAPPZ for Android	Yes	Yes	Yes	Yes
Types of map	Map, satellite, terrain, street	Road, satellite, hybrid, bird's eye, traffic, 3D, London street map, ordnance survey map, venue map	Map, satellite	Outdoor, satellite, winter, standard, traffic, terrain, haptic only Czech Republic: cadastral, historic (19th century)	Map, terrain, satellite (exclusive to editing)	Map, satellite, terrain, 3D with plugin, 3D without plugin for compatible browsers, night mode	Map, satellite, terrain, hybrid, flyover, 3D	Map, satellite, hybrid, 3D	Map, traffic, 3D
Cell-based location	Yes	Yes	Unknown	Yes	Unknown	Yes	Yes	Yes	Yes
Wi-fi location	Yes	Yes	Unknown		Yes	Yes	Yes	Yes	Yes
Supported languages	74	117		20			33	4	7

== See also ==
- List of online map services
- GraphHopper
- Navteq
- Petal Maps
- Online virtual globes
- Tencent Maps
- Traffic Message Channel (TMC)
