= Apple Maps =

Map application operated by Apple

- Apple Maps on an iPhone 17 Pro running iOS 27.
- Developer: Apple
- Release: September 19, 2012; 14 years ago
- Operating system: iOS 6 and later, iPadOS, watchOS, macOS, Safari, Chrome, Edge and Firefox.
- Service name: Apple Maps
- Available in: 33 languages
- List of languages English, Arabic, Catalan, Croatian, Czech, Danish, Dutch, Finnish, French, German, Greek, Hebrew, Hindi, Hungarian, Indonesian, Italian, Japanese, Korean, Malay, Norwegian Bokmål, Polish, Portuguese, Romanian, Russian, Simplified Chinese, Slovak, Spanish, Swedish, Thai, Traditional Chinese, Turkish, Ukrainian, Vietnamese
- Type: Web mapping
- Website: Home Page apple.com/maps; Web App maps.apple.com

Apple Maps is a web mapping service developed by Apple. As the default map system of iOS, iPadOS, macOS, tvOS, visionOS, and watchOS, it provides directions and estimated times of arrival for driving, walking, cycling, and public transportation navigation. A "Flyover" mode shows certain urban centers and other places of interest in a 3D landscape composed of models of buildings and structures.

First released on September 19, 2012, Apple Maps replaced Google Maps as the default map system on Apple devices. At launch, it drew criticism from users and reviewers for incorrect directions, sparse data about public transportation, and various other bugs and errors. Apple has since further developed the software to address the issues raised by such criticism.

While previously exclusive to Apple devices, Apple released a cross-platform MapKit JS API in 2018, allowing Apple Maps to be embedded on the web.

As of July 2024, Apple Maps is available directly on Apple's website.

== History ==
=== Initial release ===
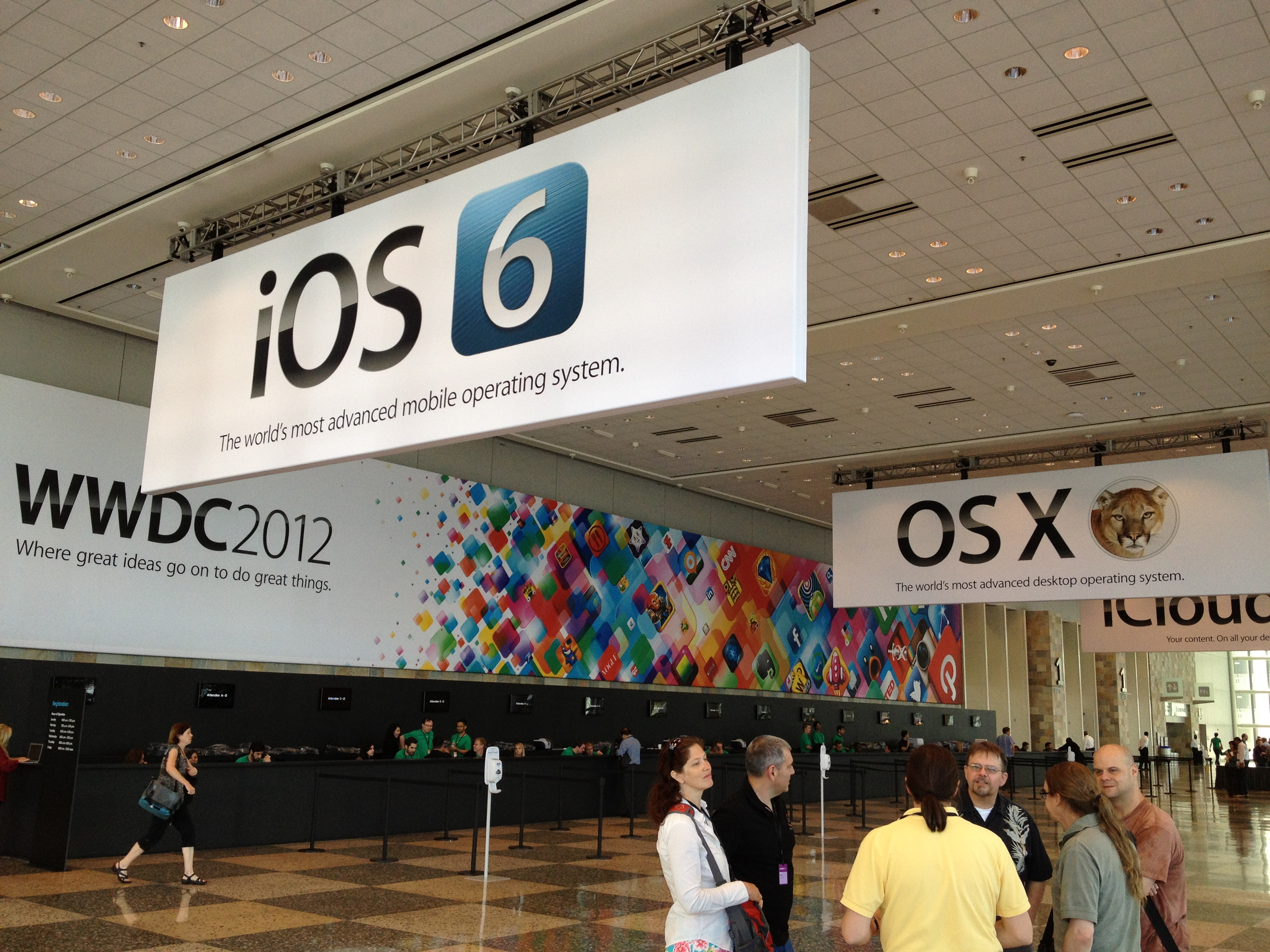
Apple Maps was announced along with iOS 6, OS X Mountain Lion, and iCloud during the 2012 Apple Worldwide Developers Conference (WWDC).

Apple revealed that the application would replace Google Maps as the default web mapping service for iOS. Apple also announced that the application would include turn-by-turn navigation, 3D maps, and the virtual assistant Siri. The mapping service was released on September 19, 2012. Following the launch, Apple Maps was heavily criticized, which resulted in a public apology by Apple CEO Tim Cook in late September and the departure of two key employees of Apple (see also §Early inaccuracy).

Google Maps was the default mapping app in iOS from the first generation iPhone in 2007. In late 2009, tensions between Google and Apple started when the Android version of Google Maps featured turn-by-turn navigation, a feature which the iOS version lacked. At the time, Apple argued that Google collected too much user data. When Apple made iOS 6 available, Google Maps could only be accessed by iOS 6 users via the web. Although Google did not immediately launch an iOS version Maps, shortly after the announcement of Apple Maps, Google did add a Flyover feature to its virtual globe application Google Earth. Three months later, in December 2012, Google Maps was released in the App Store. This version of Google Maps, unlike the previous version, featured turn-by-turn navigation. Shortly after it was launched, it was the most popular free application in the App Store.

Speculation around Apple creating a mapping service of its own arose in 2009 after computer magazine Computerworld reported that Apple had acquired Jaron Waldman's company Placebase, an online mapping service, in July of that year. The CEO of Placebase became a part of Apple's "Geo Team". In the following two years, Apple acquired two more mapping related companies who specialized in 3D maps: Poly9 in 2010 and C3 Technologies in 2011. C3 Technologies' imagery was later used for the Flyover feature in Apple Maps. Earlier in 2011, Apple indicated its plan for a mapping service when it stated on its website that it was collecting location data to create "an improved traffic service in the next couple of years" for iPhone users. In September 2012, when Apple Maps was released, a "source" connected to both Google and Apple Maps claimed to technology website TechCrunch that Apple was recruiting Google employees that worked on Google Maps.

=== 2012–2015 ===
In the first year after its release, Apple Maps received a number of improvements which solved various errors in the application. Other changes included adding more satellite imagery and making the navigation available in more cities. In 2013, Apple also acquired a few companies to improve Apple Maps, namely HopStop, Embark, WifiSlam, and Locationary, as well as the team and the technology of the company BroadMap. HopStop and Embark both specialized in mapping public transportation, WifiSlam specialized in interior maps, Locationary provided accurate company data for mapping services, and BroadMap managed, sorted, and analyzed map data.

During WWDC in June 2013, Apple announced the new version of Apple Maps in iOS 7. This new version (and the rest of the operating system) had a new look and icon. Several new functions were also implemented, including full-screen mode, night mode, real-time traffic information, navigation for pedestrians, and the Frequent Locations feature. The latter feature, which can be switched on and off, was introduced to record the most frequently visited destinations by users in order to improve Apple Maps. In addition, new satellite imagery was added once again. On September 18, 2013, Apple released iOS 7. At that time, the new iPhone 5S included a new motion coprocessor, the M7, which can identify whether a user is walking or driving in order to adjust the navigation mode.

During that same conference, Apple announced that a desktop version of the application would be made available for OS X Mavericks. On October 22, 2013, Apple released OS X Mavericks and the desktop version of Apple Maps. The desktop version was similar to that in iOS 7, but it connected with the Contacts and Calendar applications. Additionally, the desktop version enabled users to send locations and directions to other devices with iOS. In June of the following year, Apple acquired the company Spotsetter, a social search engine that gave personalized recommendations for places to visit. Since the acquisition, most of its employees work at Apple.

On September 17, 2014, the successor of iOS 7, iOS 8, became available. Later that year, on October, 16, Apple released OS X Yosemite. Neither update brought any major modifications to Apple Maps. However, the feature "City Tours" was introduced to both iOS and OS X. This function made it possible for the user to be guided through locations with Flyovers. Also, Apple Maps results were shown in the search feature Spotlight in OS X Yosemite. Later in 2014, Apple news website 9to5Mac reported that in the previous months a number of Apple Maps employees, including a key employee, had left the company to work for Uber. In the next year, Apple Maps was added to the new Apple Watch, which was released on April 24. The app indicates navigation instructions by taps on the user's wrist.

=== 2015–2018 ===
During WWDC on June 8, 2015, Craig Federighi, Apple's senior vice president of Software Engineering, announced that the new version of Apple Maps in iOS 9 would have information about public transportation in a number of global cities. The function also became available for OS X El Capitan and watchOS 2. In addition, Apple added the function "Nearby", which shows nearby points of interest in several categories. With the update, the application chooses a detour in case of a traffic delay. The three new versions of the operating systems became available in September 2015. In addition to these new releases, Apple acquired a few companies in 2015 in order to improve the mapping application even further. In the spring, Apple also acquired Coherent Navigation, that provides precise location data through High Integrity GPS, and the startup company Mapsense later that year. The latter had developed software to organize large amounts of location data.

In 2016, Apple Maps opened a new development center and it was updated for watchOS and iOS. The application was improved when watchOS 2.2 came out in March 2016. Apple Maps was renewed in the new version of the operating system and received several new features, including "Nearby" which had previously been exclusive to iOS. Four months later, Apple CEO Tim Cook inaugurated a new office in partnership with IT company RMSI, Noida, at the WaveRock campus in Hyderabad, India. The development center focuses on the development of Apple Maps and employs 4,000 people. According to ZDNet, the 250,000 square feet (23,000 square metres) office cost US$25 million. In September, iOS 10 was released. The update of the Apple's mobile operating system was accompanied by a new design of Apple Maps. Moreover, the application was opened up to developers and gained a few features: it makes suggestions for places to go based on earlier usage of the app, it can remember the location where the user parked their vehicle, it allows a user to filter search suggestions, and the turn-by-turn navigation was improved. The navigation automatically zooms in and out, shows traffic ahead, and allows users to search for points of interests along the route. These features are available for CarPlay as well.

=== 2018–present ===
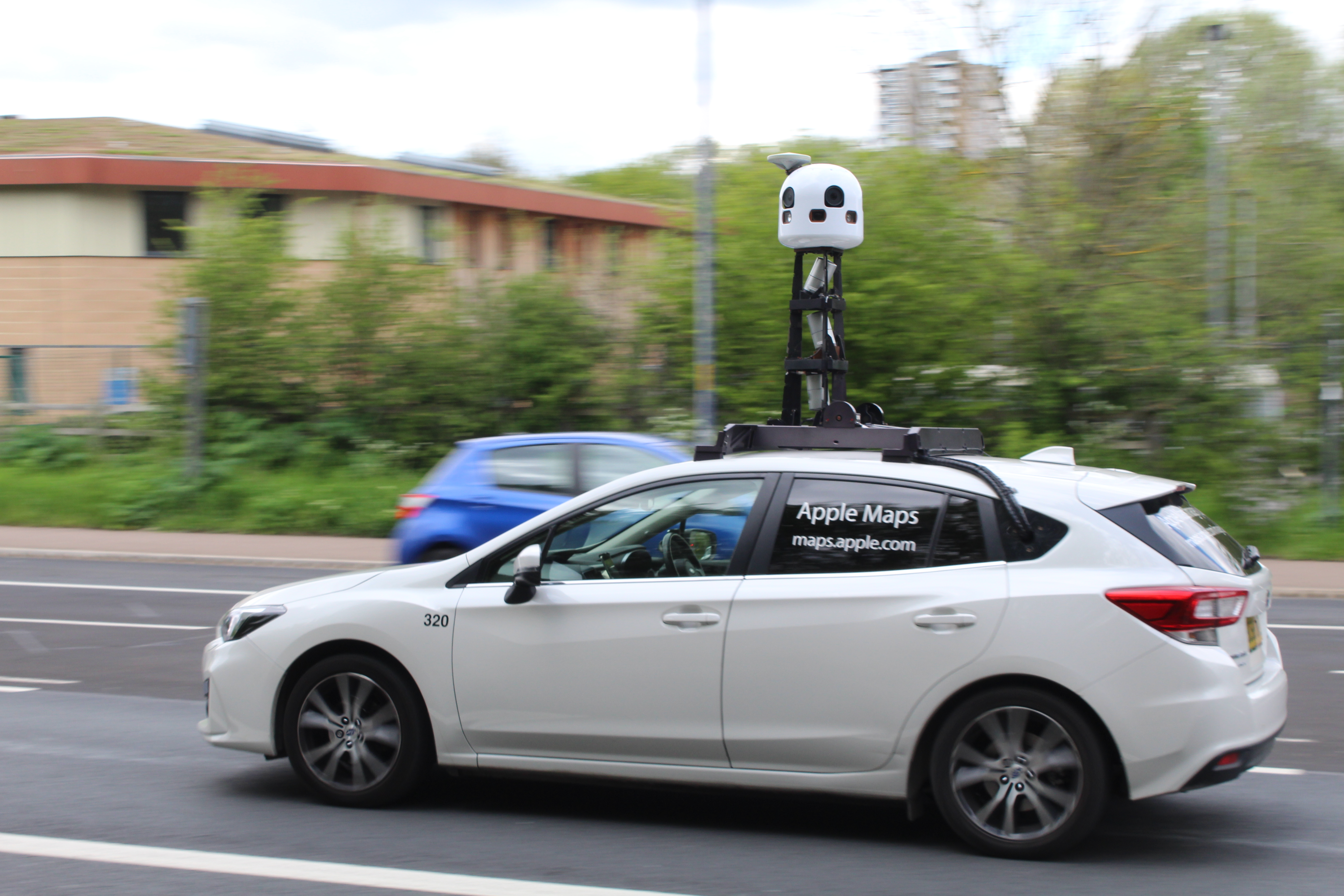
An Apple Maps Subaru Impreza data and image collection vehicle in Kent, England in April 2023

In early 2018, Apple announced that Maps now included bike-sharing stations in more than 175 cities in 36 countries, including San Francisco (Bay Wheels), New York (Citi Bike), Montreal (BIXI), London (Santander Cycles), Paris (Vélib' Métropole) and Brisbane (CityCycle).

In summer 2018, Maps leader Eddy Cue announced major updates to Apple Maps, which he said had been rebuilt "from the ground up" using map data Apple had been quietly gathering for the past four years. Newly detailed maps were available first for the San Francisco Bay area, and later for other areas of the United States and other countries. Areas with the new detail show outlines of buildings, more minor roads (for example, roads within parking lots), walking paths, and traffic lights and stop signs during navigation. Grassy areas also show more detail; for example, strips of grass and vegetation between roads, outlines of holes on golf courses, baseball/football fields within parks, etc.

In November 2018, Apple said that it would send its backpack-wearing team to various locations, including Los Angeles, San Francisco, and Santa Clara County, in an attempt to improve Apple Maps' walking directions along footpaths and walkways. The company also said it would deploy its mapping cars throughout the US and the UK to gather its own data and add details to the maps.

By the end of January 2020, Apple completed the rollout of their new maps detail in the United States and the District of Columbia; several U.S. territories were also added in April 2020. Apple also said that Europe would receive updated maps later that year. During WWDC on June 22, 2020, Apple announced that the UK, Ireland, and Canada would be the first countries outside of the U.S. to receive the updated maps.

In September 2020, cycling directions were added to Maps alongside the public rollout of iOS 14, iPadOS 14, and watchOS 7. As of launch, cycling directions were only available in the cities of New York, Los Angeles, San Francisco, Shanghai, and Beijing, but Apple intends to add more over time. In October, Apple updated the United Kingdom and Ireland to include their new maps detail, Look Around, and cycling directions. On October 19, 2020, Apple began testing their new maps for Canada and rolled out the final version on December 10, 2020.

On April 22, 2021, Apple began testing its new maps for Spain and Portugal, with the final version going live during Apple's annual WWDC conference on June 7, 2021. In addition, Apple announced that Italy and Australia would get the new maps later in the year. During WWDC 2021, Apple had announced a brand new "city experience" for select areas that would include real-world road widths and marking, vegetation, turn lanes and realistic building models and colors, among other things. Apple released this new experience in seven cities in 2021, including Los Angeles and New York. In addition, Apple announced new changes to the "Transit" feature and non-vehicle directions, such as new AR walking directions and the ability to follow transit on an Apple Watch. Apple published its new map data in Italy, San Marino, Vatican City and Andorra on September 10, 2021, while also adding real-time transit for Rome, Milan, and Turin on the 26th. Apple released its new map data for Australia on December 9, 2021. In August 2021, native ratings and a photo system became available to US users, previously using Foursquare, Yelp and Tripadvisor.

On March 4, 2022, Apple began testing its new map data in Germany and Singapore, with the final version launching on April 21, 2022. On March 24, 2022, Apple released its new detailed city experience for Montreal, Toronto, and Vancouver. On May 29, 2022, Apple began testing its new map data in France, Monaco, and New Zealand, with the final version launching on July 7, 2022. During Apple's annual WWDC conference on June 6, 2022, Apple announced that in addition to France, Monaco, and New Zealand, the new maps would be expanded to Belgium, Israel, Liechtenstein, Luxembourg, Netherlands, Palestinian Territories, Saudi Arabia, and Switzerland. As for the Detailed City Experience, Apple had announced that Atlanta, Chicago, Las Vegas, Miami, Seattle, Sydney and Melbourne would be getting it later in the year. Apple had introduced multi-stop routing, Pay in Transit, and Mapkit for better integration of products in apps for developers.

On August 5, 2022, Apple began testing its new map data in Israel, the Palestinian Territories and Saudi Arabia. Apple also published the new Detailed City Experience for Atlanta, Miami and Seattle. On September 12, 2022, Apple published the new Detailed City Experience for Chicago and Las Vegas alongside the launch of iOS 16. On November 2, 2022, Apple began testing its new map data in Belgium, Liechtenstein, Luxembourg, Netherlands, and Switzerland, with the final version launching on December 15, 2022, alongside Israel, Saudi Arabia, and Palestinian Territories.

On January 19, 2023, Apple launched the new Detailed City Experience for Sydney and Melbourne. On January 23, 2023, Apple began testing its new map data in Austria, Finland, Norway, and Sweden, with the latter three being released on March 2, 2023. On March 10, 2023, Apple started testing its new map in Austria, Croatia, the Czech Republic, Hungary, Poland, and Slovenia. The map data was officially published on April 6, 2023. On May 2, 2023, Apple started testing its new map in Hong Kong, Slovakia, and Taiwan. The new maps began rolling out to all users on June 15, 2023.

During Apple's annual WWDC conference on June 5, 2023, it was announced that offline maps would be coming to the Maps app, along with enhanced EV routing. Later that day, Apple released the Detailed City Experience for Paris.

On July 27, 2023, Apple released the Detailed City Experience for Dallas and Houston and added Look Around imagery for Dallas, Minneapolis, and Tampa Bay. On July 31, 2023, Apple began testing its new map data in Denmark and Greece. The new maps launched for everyone on October 12, 2023.

On July 24, 2024, Apple began public beta testing Apple Maps on the web. The web version was initially only available on Safari and Chrome on Mac and iPad, and Chrome and Edge on Windows PCs. Support was later added for Firefox on August 13, 2024, and for mobile devices in April 2025, when it exited beta. However, the transit and 3D building features are not yet available on the web version.

On October 25, 2024, Apple released the Detailed City Experience for Amsterdam. In order to improve the service in India, the Apple Maps team has been surveying roads in several states since November 2024 using sophisticated camera and Lidar-equipped backpacks to obtain precise road markings.

On January 25, 2025, Apple began testing its new map data in Thailand. On January 30, 2025, Apple released the Detailed City Experience for New Orleans.

On August 7, 2025, Apple released the Detailed City Experience for Singapore. Later in August, Apple released its new map data in Mexico.

On July 23, 2026, Apple announced the expansion of Apple Maps to automobiles via the introduction of the MapKit for Automotive API, and subsequently announced that Ford would adopt Apple Maps for the navigation system in their upcoming Universal Electric Vehicle platform in 2027.

On September 14, 2026, Apple released the overhauled flyover update with IOS 27, which combined aerial imagery with AI and Visual Intelligence models to render 3D trees and buildings in higher detail with sharper textures.

== Features ==
Apple Maps giving directions from San Francisco to Los Angeles, as shown on an iPad running iPadOS 26

Apple Maps started using vector graphics before competitor Google Maps, which allowed the application to use less data than Google Maps. The map has four available layers: regular map, satellite view, hybrid view (a combination of regular and satellite view), and public transit view. The main provider of map data is TomTom, but data is also supplied by Automotive Navigation Data, Getchee, Hexagon AB, IGN, Increment P, Intermap Technologies, LeadDog, MDA Information Systems, OpenStreetMap, and Waze. Apple renewed their agreement with TomTom in 2015, though later decided to gradually switch to OpenStreetMap and remove all of TomTom-contributed map data except for live traffic information. TomTom is the parent company of Tele Atlas, which is also used by Apple Maps' competitor, Google Maps. The satellite imagery comes from Maxar Technologies. iPhones located in China use data from AutoNavi and MapKing for Hong Kong instead.

Apple Maps can be used to plan routes. Apple expands their basic Maps interface by adding badges. A weather and air quality index badge will be seen alongside the current traffic information constantly. Before, a user could only observe the traffic information while using the turn-by-turn directions. According to Apple, the navigation function is available in 56 countries worldwide. Apple Maps can also be used to see real-time traffic information. In addition, Apple's virtual assistant, Siri, is integrated into Apple Maps. The map displays points of interest provided by approximately twenty companies, including Booking.com, Foursquare, TripAdvisor, and Yelp. The data from Foursquare was added in late 2015. Users can drop pins on the map to save places for later retrieval. The satellite view features Flyovers, three-dimensional satellite views, in designated locations.

=== Flyover and 3D maps ===
With Flyover, certain locations — mainly big cities and landmarks — can be seen from a birds-eye perspective. The three-dimensional views are photo-realistic, and users can change the perspective. Flyover has been available since the first release of Apple Maps. Many cities with Flyovers also have "City Tours." With this feature, the user is guided in the Flyover view along landmarks in that location. "City Tours" was added to Apple Maps in iOS 8 (released on September 17, 2014) and in OS X Yosemite (released on October 16, 2014). In addition to Flyovers, more than 300 cities also feature 3D maps. This feature enables the user to see three-dimensional models of structures in the map view. These models, which are not photo-realistic, can also be seen when using the turn-by-turn navigation.

=== Nearby ===
The "Nearby" feature in Apple Maps is available on iOS 15 and watchOS 8 It allows users to search for nearby places of interest, such as restaurants, gas stations, and parking lots, among others. Users can also access indoor maps of select airports and shopping malls.

When a user selects a category, such as "food" or "transportation," nearby points of interest in that category are displayed with their names, distances, and reviews on Yelp. Pins also appear at the locations of these places on the map Turn-by-turn navigation can be activated with Nearby as well.

=== Transit ===
The "Transit" function shows the public transport networks on the map in a number of cities and their surroundings. The functionality was added to iOS 9, OS X El Capitan, and watchOS 2. Apple Maps displays the networks of buses, subways, trains, and ferries in these cities. Additionally, the mapping service includes public transit schedules and shows the locations of the entries and exits of the subway and train stations.

Support for all the routes of Amtrak in the United States has been added as of October 2, 2016. The routes of NSW TrainLink in New South Wales were added in April 2016. The routes of V/Line (Regional Rail) in Victoria (Australia) were added on October 9, 2016. Transit directions were expanded across the United Kingdom, excluding Northern Ireland, on December 19, 2016. Ireland (Republic of Ireland and Northern Ireland) was added on October 16, 2017.

Apple's transit directions are not available in third-party apps.

In iOS 16, Apple added the ability to add Transit Cards to the Maps app, as well as see Transit Fares.

=== Congestion zones ===
With the release of iOS 14, various countries in Europe received congestion zone alerts in the Maps app to reduce harmful emissions in the area. Users have the option of inputting navigation that avoids these areas. As of iOS 16, this feature has expanded outside of Europe.

=== Indoor airport and shopping mall maps ===
Apple Indoor Maps is a feature of Apple Maps that provides indoor maps for select airports and shopping malls. It was first introduced in iOS 11 and has since been expanded to include more locations. The feature provides detailed information about the interior of these buildings, allowing users to navigate them more easily.

Apple developed the Indoor Mapping Data Format (IMDF) to provide indoor maps for venues. The format is designed to be mobile-friendly, compact, human-readable, and highly extensible. It provides a basis for orientation, navigation, and discovery within indoor spaces.

Apple Indoor Maps may be used by users who need to navigate large and unfamiliar buildings. It may also be used by businesses to provide their customers with a way to navigate their premises.

=== Traffic information ===
Apple Maps shows real-time traffic information on the map. In addition, the turn-by-turn navigation takes delays into account when calculating the estimated time of arrival and will occasionally choose a detour in case of traffic. Apple introduced this function in iOS 7 and it is available in 75 countries as of June 2019. In the beginning of 2015, Consumentenbond, a Dutch organization promoting consumer rights, researched the traffic information of various navigation applications and concluded that Apple Maps gave the most false responses of all seven applications that were tested.

=== Speed cameras and incident reporting ===
iOS 14 introduced the addition of speed cameras when doing turn-by-turn navigation. In iOS 14.5, Apple implemented new ways to report incidents in real-time, with users able to report accidents, hazards, and speed checks during their route using Siri.

=== Cycling directions ===
Alongside the announcement of iOS 14 at WWDC 2020, Apple introduced cycling directions for Apple Maps. As of February 2026, it covers cities in over 30 countries worldwide.

=== Look Around ===
Look Around allows the user to view 360° street-level imagery, with smooth transitions as the scene is navigated to provide precision in city environment. Look Around was introduced with iOS 13 at Apple Worldwide Developers Conference in June 2019. It was publicly released as part of iOS 13, with additional areas to be covered as time goes on.

=== Apple Maps Connect ===
In October 2014, Apple introduced Apple Maps Connect, which allows small business owners to claim their business listing and edit business information, such as location and open hours. After the user logs in with their Apple ID, they are given a prompt to claim and link an Apple Maps listing to their account. The user can search through Apple's database to locate their listing or add a missing listing.

=== Detailed City Experience ===
At WWDC 2021, Apple officials announced they would add new information to Apple Maps' portrayal of various cities, including real-world widths of roads, accurate elevations, and more detailed depictions of some buildings and landmarks.

=== Native ratings and reviews ===
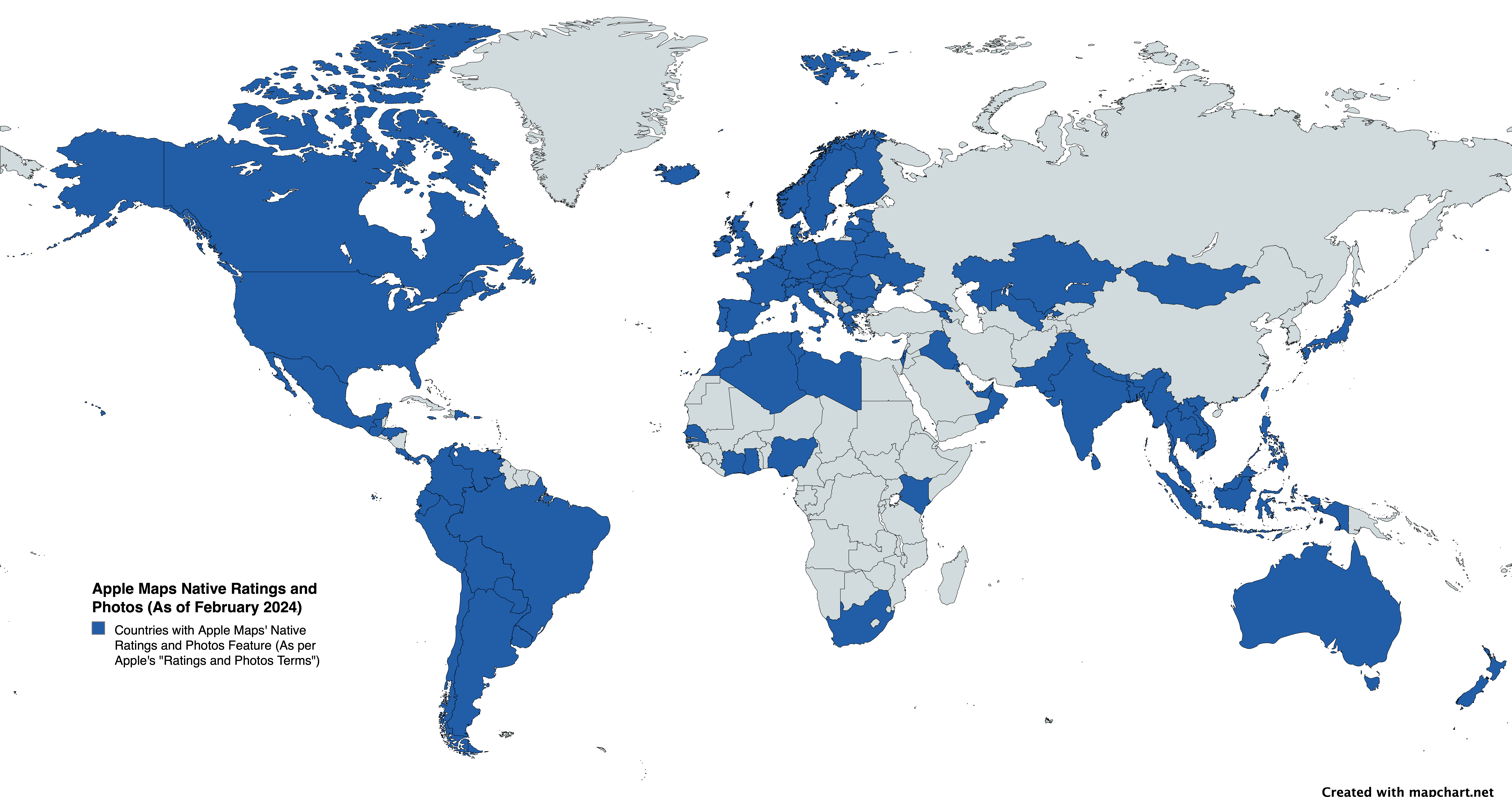
Map showing Apple Maps' Native Ratings and Photos feature's availability worldwide as of the update in February 2024

iOS 14 introduced the addition of native ratings and reviews to make it easier to search ratings. Yelp, as a result, is slowly being phased out in exchange for this new system. The feature allows users to rate the app with a thumbs up or thumbs down on a select range of categories depending on the type of business, alongside an overall rating. The average rating for each category is displayed for each business, and the "Overall" category can be seen in search results.

Users are also now able to upload their own photos they took of the locations.

This feature is available only in certain countries, as shown on the map.

=== Guides ===
At WWDC 2020, Apple announced that iOS 14 would bring "Guides"—packages of tourist information—for certain cities, many produced by third-party publications.

== Market share ==
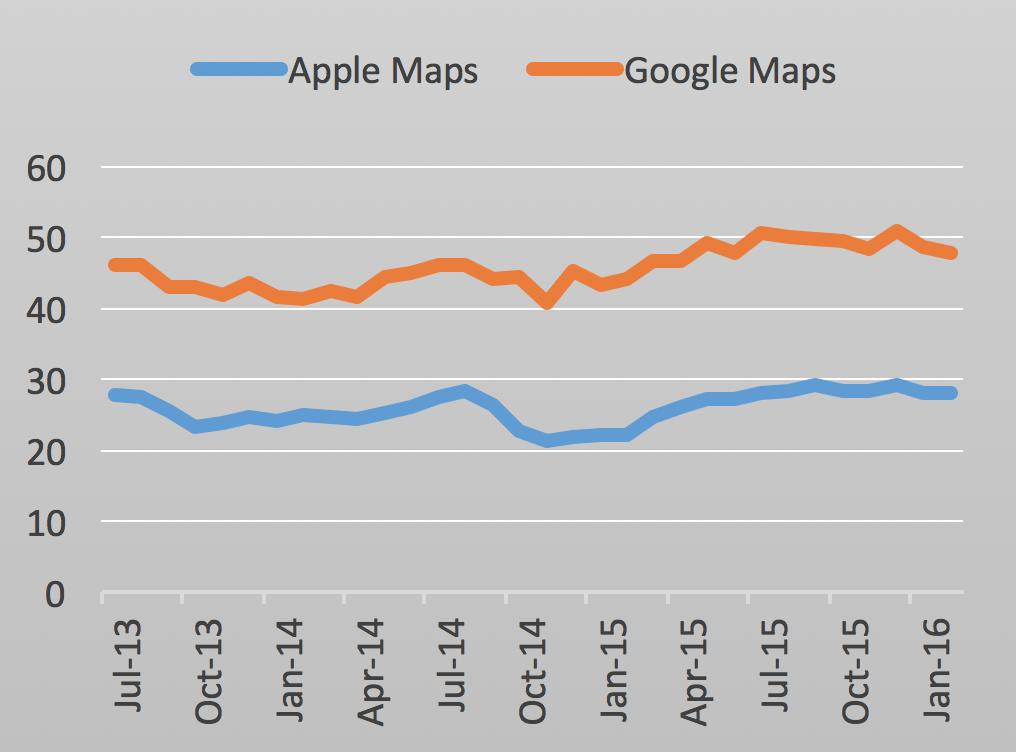
A graph showing the percentage of American smartphone users who used Apple Maps (blue) and Google Maps (orange) between July 2013 and February 2016 (estimated by comScore)

Prior to the launch of Apple Maps in September 2012, there were 103.6 million Americans with iOS or Android, 81 million of whom used Google Maps. One year after the release of Apple Maps, there were 136.7 million Americans with iOS or Android. During this time, Google Maps users decreased to 58.7 million, while Apple Maps gained 35 million new users. Out of the 60.1 million iPhone users, 8.3 million used Google Maps. However, some of those iPhone users were not able to use Apple Maps, since their devices were not updated to iOS 6.

Between July 2013 and February 2016, 20% to 30% of all American smartphone users utilized Apple Maps, including those with operating systems that were not compatible. During the same timeframe, 40% to 51% of American smartphone owners used Google Maps.

In September 2013, one year after its launch, more than 6.2 million of the total 10.35 million British iPhone owners used Apple Maps. Google Maps had the second largest market share on British iPhones with over 1.8 million British iPhone users.

In 2024, Google Maps had approximately 1.8 billion users while Apple Maps had 500 million users.

== Reception ==
=== Early inaccuracy (2012) ===
Apple Maps received considerable criticism after its launch on September 19, 2012, due to wrong and inaccurate information about places and points of interest. Many of these errors have since been fixed.

Some places were misspelled, displayed with the wrong name, or missing entirely. Examples of those mistakes included the Ukrainian capital Kyiv, which was incorrectly spelled as "Kylv", the Welsh town Pontypridd, whose label was shown 6 miles (10 kilometres) northeast of its actual location, and the English town Stratford-upon-Avon, which was missing altogether in Apple Maps. Also, when users looked up "London," they were directed to the Canadian city London, Ontario, instead of its namesake, the capital of the United Kingdom. Many complained about outdated or inaccurate data about companies and places of interest. For example, in the United Kingdom, chains that no longer exist were still on the maps, and large stores were accidentally mapped in backyards. Furthermore, in the United States, the label of the Willis Tower was displayed in the wrong location. Apple Maps was sometimes inadequate to find companies or other points of interest at all. For instance, the London train and underground station Paddington and Tokyo Station were missing, and the Helsinki Central railway station was shown as a park. Also, parks were occasionally displayed as airports. Some instances of maps had cloud cover that obstructed the view of the road.

On several occasions, government authorities and politicians warned citizens of errors with Apple Maps. In early December 2012, the police department of the Australian city Mildura alerted people who planned to reach the city using Apple Maps, because Mildura was shown in the middle of Murray-Sunset National Park, 40 miles (64 kilometres) from its actual location. The police department stated that the error was potentially life-threatening, as national park temperatures could rise to 114 °F (46 °C) and those traveling would be without water supplies. The police rescued at least four people, one of whom was stranded for 24 hours. After that, the police department tried to contact Apple to solve the problem. Apple fixed the error in December 2012. Alan Shatter, the Minister for Justice and Equality and Minister of Defence of Ireland, issued a warning because of a mistake in Apple Maps: a non-existent airport was shown near the Irish capital Dublin. This location was in reality a public farm called "Airfield." Shatter wrote in his statement that the mistake was dangerous because a pilot could try to make an emergency landing there.

==== Apple's response ====
As a result of the criticism, Tim Cook, CEO of Apple, published a letter of apology on Apple's website on September 28, 2012, in which he apologized for the "frustrations" experienced by users. He said that Apple fell short and that the company was making every effort to improve the mapping service. Cook also suggested that dissatisfied users could use rival mapping applications like Bing Maps, MapQuest, Waze, Google Maps, and Nokia Maps. Steve Jobs, former CEO of Apple, had used this way of apologizing in the past. A week before the release of the letter of apology, just after the launch of Apple Maps, spokesperson Trudy Miller had stated to technology news website All Things Digital that Apple Maps was a major initiative and that they "were just getting started with it." Miller also said the application would improve as more people used it.

In the aftermath of the criticism, two key employees left the company due to the problems associated with Apple Maps. The departure of Scott Forstall, senior vice president of iOS, was announced in October 2012. Sources told technology news website The Verge that he had been fired for refusing to sign Tim Cook's letter of apology. According to business magazine Bloomberg Businessweek, Richard Williamson, the person responsible for the mapping team at Apple, left the following month. He was succeeded by Eddy Cue.

In June 2016, Eddy Cue said in an interview with Fast Company that Apple "had completely underestimated the product, the complexity of it." He also said the problems with Apple Maps led to "significant changes to all of our development processes." After the launch of Maps, Apple started offering public betas of new versions of iOS and OS X. Furthermore, Cue commented that before Maps was launched Apple's executive team long discussed if Apple should have its own mapping service. One month later, Tim Cook looked back to the launch of Apple Maps in an interview with The Washington Post and said "Maps was a mistake." He added that the company admitted its mistake and that Maps is something the company is now proud of because of the improvements.

==== TomTom's response ====
As the primary provider of map data, TomTom has also received criticism. Cees van Dok, TomTom's head of user experience design, in April 2013 told technology news website TechRadar that Apple was the problem. According to him, Apple was trying to combine too many sources of data to create Apple Maps.

=== 2016–present ===
Despite fixing preliminary issues, Apple Maps has received mixed reviews, with some critics complimenting its "Flyover" feature and appearance of the street map, while others are criticizing its lack of features similar to those in Google Maps. ZDNet said "[Apple Maps] had its share of problems, but Apple Maps is back with a vengeance. Powered by some jaw-dropping 3D graphics and enjoying an aggressive multi-platform strategy, Apple is finally set to redefine our geospatial expectations – and take Google down a few notches." An editor of The Street wrote "But, today, and presumably after the iOS 7 update, Apple Maps has come into its own.

In 2019, Apple began rolling out a comprehensive overhaul of Apple Maps to certain areas. The redesigned Maps introduced significant improvements, including more comprehensive views of roads and buildings, enhanced pedestrian data, more precise addresses, and detailed land cover. Apple completed the rollout of this new experience in the United States by early 2020, adding features like faster navigation, Look Around (a high-resolution, interactive street-level imagery feature), and Favorites for quick access to frequently visited places. Eddy Cue described the update as a complete rebuild of the app, with privacy as a central focus. The redesign received praise for its visual improvements and functionality, with critics noting that it addressed many of the app's initial shortcomings and brought the experience closer to competing services like Google Maps. These "new maps" have continued to expand to other countries over time.

Macworld wrote in 2021, "Apple Maps has vastly improved since it was first launched and now we conclude the turn-by-turn navigation is a lot better than Google's offering. While there are areas that both Google and Apple can improve on, we're certain that using Apple Maps won't direct you to drive into the Thames and that most of the initial issues have been fixed." Thrillist wrote an article about "Things Apple Maps Does Better Than Google Maps," praising its ability to let the user "send directions instantly from your computer to your phone," "see turn-by-turn directions from the lock screen," "get more specific recommendations for nearby attractions," "know which subway car to get on and which exit to use," "see true-to-life details," and "get seamless directions from Siri." Apple Maps was also praised for its Look Around feature offering higher quality images than Google Street View.

Apple Maps allows integration with a car's multi-media system through CarPlay.

Taiwan (Republic of China) was classified as a province of the People's Republic of China in the application in 2013; searches for "Taiwan" were changed automatically to "China Taiwan province" in Simplified Chinese, prompting the Taiwan Ministry of Foreign Affairs to demand a correction from Apple.

== Controversies ==
=== China ===
According to Travel + Leisure magazine, it is illegal for foreign individuals and companies to create maps within China without official permission from the Chinese government. As a result, mapping services such as Apple Maps comply with local regulations and data systems, which has drawn criticism regarding its map concerning the greater China region. Apple uses map data from AutoNavi within the People's Republic of China (only when the device itself is located inside mainland China), and uses TomTom and local map suppliers for Taiwan and Hong Kong. If the phone is located within mainland China, it can result in all geotagged photos taken in Taiwan, Arunachal Pradesh, or the disputed South China Sea islands being applied with an incorrect location, or displaying the area as part of China. There are some English language issues with the Chinese pinyin transliterations of the Chinese names in Taiwan and Hong Kong. Photos taken in Taipei will display the location as "Taiwan Province, China". According to an Indian NDTV report in 2010, bloggers had complained that the map data shown on iPhones in China had differed from international versions, with disputed areas such as Arunachal Pradesh displayed according to Chinese official territorial representations. According to reporting by The Information, relying on "unnamed sources and internal documents", Apple modified the display of the Senkaku Islands (known in China as the Diaoyu Islands) for users in China, reportedly rendering them at a larger scale following a request from Chinese authorities.

=== South Korea ===
Apple Maps has limited functionality in South Korea due to restrictions on geographic data in South Korea.

Voice of America reported that in 2012, Apple Maps had faced a formal protest from the South Korean government for their labelling of the disputed small island chain of Liancourt Rocks (known as Dokdo in Korean and as Takeshima in Japanese), which is currently disputed between South Korea and Japan. South Korea, which claims sovereignty over the islands, stated it was unacceptable for Apple Maps to use alternative names, including the Japanese designation.

=== Ukraine ===
Apple's compliance with local laws has been criticized. For example, Apple labels Crimea as part of Russia in Apple Maps, specifically for users who were accessing the app with a Crimean IP address. Users in the rest of the world are shown Crimea as belonging to Ukraine.

In response to the Russian invasion of Ukraine, Apple suspended its business operations in Russia. As a safety precaution to those in Ukraine, Apple had also disabled live traffic and other features in Maps.

=== United States ===
Apple's response to the Gulf of Mexico–America naming dispute was to relabel the Gulf of Mexico to "Gulf of America" for users in the United States, following an official update to the U.S. Geographic Names Information System, which implemented the signing of Executive Order 14172 by President Trump.

On September 1, 2026, Apple Maps made a similar change, renaming Lake Ontario to Lake America for users in US and Lake Ontario (Lake America) outside of America after President Trump signed an executive order.

== See also ==
- Citymapper
- Comparison of web map services
- Here WeGo
- MapQuest
- OpenStreetMap
- Organic Maps
- Google Maps
- Waze
