= MapQuest =

American free online mapping service

- Screenshot Screenshot of MapQuest in use
- Website type: Web mapping
- Available in: Multilingual
- Parent: AOL (2000–2015); Verizon Media (2015–2019); System1 (2019–present)
- Website: mapquest.com
- Registration: Optional
- Launched: February 6, 1996; 30 years ago
- Current status: Active

MapQuest (formerly stylized as mapquest) is an American free online web mapping service. It was launched in 1996 as the first commercial web mapping service. MapQuest's competitors include Apple Maps, Google Maps and Here. MapQuest lost popularity in the mid-2000s with the emergence of Google Maps, but saw a resurgence in popularity in 2026 during the second presidency of Donald Trump.

== History ==
Former logo, phased out as part of website redesign on July 14, 2010

Logo used in 2017

=== Founding (1967) ===
MapQuest's origins date to 1967 with the founding of Cartographic Services, a division of R.R. Donnelley & Sons in Chicago, which moved to Lancaster, Pennsylvania, in 1969. In the mid-1980s, Donnelley & Sons began generating maps and routes for customers with the help of Barry Glick at University at Buffalo, who had a PhD degree in geography. In 1994, it was spun off as GeoSystems Global Corporation. Much of the code was adapted for use on the internet to create the MapQuest web service in 1996. MapQuest's original services were mapping (referred to as "Interactive Atlas") and driving directions (called "TripQuest").

The initial Denver team consisted of Evans, Simon Greenman, Chris Fanjoy, and Harry Grout. To make MapQuest a serious contender in the online spatial application market, a robust set of geographical tools was developed under Greenman's direction. Grout, who had spent time at Rand McNally; Etak, a now defunct mapping company; and Navigation Technologies Corporation (Navteq) building digital map data, was tasked with acquiring data and licensing arrangements. The initial team experienced rapid growth in the Denver office, and in a short time MapQuest became a well-known brand.

=== IPO (1999) ===
On February 25, 1999, MapQuest went public, trading on Nasdaq. In December 1999, America Online (AOL) announced that it would acquire MapQuest for $1.1 billion. The deal closed in 2000. COO / CFO Jim Thomas managed the transactions. For a time (until 2004), MapQuest included satellite images through a licensing deal with GlobeXplorer, but later removed them because of the unorthodox business mechanics of the arrangement brokered by AOL. In September 2006, the website again began serving satellite imagery in a new beta program.

=== New product features (2004–2010) ===
In 2004, MapQuest, uLocate, Research in Motion, and Nextel launched MapQuest Find Me, a buddy-finder service which worked on GPS-enabled mobile phones. MapQuest Find Me let users automatically find their location, access maps and directions and locate nearby points of interest, including airports, hotels, restaurants, banks and ATMs. Users also had the ability to set up alerts to be notified when network members arrive at or depart from a designated area. In 2005, the service became available on Sprint (as a result of their merger with Nextel), and on Boost Mobile in 2006.

In July 2006, MapQuest created a beta version of a new feature with which users could build customized routes by adding additional stops, reordering stops along the way and avoiding any undesired turns or roads. Users could also write out the starting address. In October 2006, MapQuest sold its publishing division to concentrate on its online and mobile services. In April 2007, MapQuest announced a partnership with General Motors' OnStar to allow OnStar subscribers to plan their driving routes on MapQuest.com and send their destination to OnStar's turn-by-turn navigation service. The OnStar Web Destination Entry pilot program began in the summer of 2007 with a select group of OnStar subscribers.

Around 2008, the general public made a significant shift away from MapQuest to the much younger Google Maps service. In July 2010, MapQuest announced plans to become the first major mapping site to embrace open-source mapping data, launching a new site separate from its main site, entirely using data from the OpenStreetMap project. On July 14, 2010, MapQuest launched a simplified user interface and made the site more compact. MapQuest also introduced "My Maps" personalization, which enables the user to personalize the interface.

=== Headquarters relocation and ownership changes (2012–2019) ===
In 2012, the executive team of Glick and Perry Evans celebrated MapQuest's 15th anniversary and moved MapQuest to the LoDo area of Denver to centralize their engineering and product teams. IA Interior Architects was asked to oversee the relocation and design of the new 17,000 sq ft office.

In July 2012, Brian McMahon became the CEO and GM of MapQuest. In May 2015, with the purchase of AOL by Verizon Communications, MapQuest came under the ownership of Verizon. On July 11, 2016, MapQuest discontinued its open tile API, and users such as GNOME Maps were switched to a temporarily free tier of the Mapbox tileserver, while considering alternatives. In 2019, Verizon Media sold Mapquest to System1.

=== Second Trump administration (2025–present) ===
In early 2025, after an executive order by President Donald Trump renaming the Gulf of Mexico to the "Gulf of America", MapQuest gained attention for its satirical response. Through its official Bluesky account, MapQuest announced that they would not change the name of the gulf on their map. They later announced "Name Your Own Gulf", a website allowing someone to generate an image of a map saying "Gulf of" something, which received attention on social media and was featured on several news outlets.

Similarly, on August 27, 2026, after an analogous executive order by president Trump renaming Lake Ontario to "Lake America", MapQuest responded that it would not change the name of the lake on their map, and allowed users to generate a map with a custom name for the lake, with the "Lake" prefix. Due to Google Maps and Apple Maps switching their maps to use the name "Lake of America" for users geographically located within the United States of America, MapQuest's announcement subsequently resulted in the app becoming the most downloaded on the iPhone App Store in the United States on the morning of September 1 and second-most downloaded app overall in Canada on the night of August 30.

== Services and programs ==
From 2014, MapQuest uses some of TomTom's services for its mapping system. MapQuest provides some extent of street-level detail or driving directions for a variety of countries. Users can check if their country is available using a dropdown menu on the MapQuest home page.

The company offers a free mobile app for Android and iOS that features POI search, voice-guided navigation, real-time traffic and other features. MapQuest also offers a mobile-friendly website. MapQuest has several travel products and also includes a feature to let users compare nearby gas prices, similar to the service offered by GasBuddy. However, this feature is only available in the United States. MapQuest's POI data helps the service differentiate itself from other wayfinding software by guiding users directly to the entrances of businesses and destinations, rather than to general street addresses.

== See also ==
- Comparison of web map services
- Computer cartography
- List of online map services
