= Jim Thomas (executive) =

American business executive

- Born: James W. Thomas; 1959 (age 66–67); United States
- Occupation: Businessman

James W. Thomas or Jim Thomas is an American business executive who held was former president of Sierra and Vice president/CFO positions at MicroProse, Rivian Automotive, and MapQuest. He is known for managing the initial public offering of MapQuest.

== Early life ==
Thomas graduated from Florida Institute of Technology with a bachelor's degree in mathematics in 1972 and received a Master of Business Administration from the University of Virginia Darden School of Business.

== Career ==
His first executive role was as Executive VP and CFO for the gaming company MicroProse from 1989-1992. From 1993 to 1994 he became the President of Sierra.

In 1995, he left Sierra to assist with the startup of MapQuest. He became the Chief Operating Officer and Chief Financial Officer, and helped MapQuest become a leading internet mapping company. In 1999, he managed the initial public offering of MapQuest on the Nasdaq and sale to AOL, which was completed in 2000.

In 2010, he joined Avera Motors shortly after foundation and became the Executive Vice President and Chief Financial Officer. Avera Motors became Rivian, and he became the Vice President of Corporate Development.

In 2011, he was the recipient of the Lifetime Achievement in Technology award by Florida Congressman Bill Posey. In 2017, he was the recipient of the Florida Institute of Technology distinguished alumni award. In 2019, he was inducted into the Florida Institute of Technology Career Hall of Fame.
