= HopStop =

Online city transit guide

- Industry: Online mapping
- Founded: 2005
- Founder: Chinedu Echeruo
- Defunct: October 2015
- Fate: Acquired by Apple
- Headquarters: New York City, New York
- Owner: Apple Inc.

HopStop was an online city transit guide offering detailed, door-to-door biking, bus, subway, taxi, train, and walking directions in real time, as well as official transit maps for 600 cities around the world via Hopstop.com or apps for Android devices, iPads, iPhones, and Windows Phones. The company, founded in 2005, was named one of the top 100 fastest growing software companies in the United States in 2011.

Transit directions were available for several major metropolitan areas, including Atlanta; Boston; Chicago; Las Vegas; London; Los Angeles; New York City; Paris; Philadelphia; Portland, Oregon; San Francisco; Seattle; Toronto; and Washington, D.C.

== History ==
Chinedu Echeruo (BS Syracuse University, MBA Harvard Business School), formerly an analyst at investment banks and hedge funds, founded HopStop in 2005 and was HopStop's Chairman of the Board. He left HopStop in 2009 and is founder and CEO of the “cause-driven” social platform Gigameet.

Joe Meyer, formerly Vice President and General Manager for AOL's Quigo Technologies, came on as HopStop's President and CEO in 2009.

In 2011, HopStop was named one of the top 100 fastest growing software companies in the United States and ranked 1,182 overall on the 2011 Inc 500 | 5000 list.

Since the release of iOS 6 in September 2012, in which Apple replaced support for Google Maps with their own mapping, HopStop was named as one of the top transit apps for Apple products by multiple publishers, including Business Insider, FastCompany, and Wired.

Apple Inc. acquired HopStop in July 2013 and dropped support for Windows Phone a few days later. In September 2013, Apple removed the Android version of its app from the Play Store. In October 2015, HopStop was no longer available on any platform; Apple, instead, began using the iOS 9 update to supply Apple Maps transit directions. Apple received some criticism in response to this shutdown, mostly due to the discontinued support of around 100 cities and the very early release of the iOS9 update.

== Features ==
HopStop.com provided free customized public transit directions, as well as other related features and information relevant to public transit via HopStop.com and free Android, iOS, and Windows Phone apps.

- Users could get step-by-step biking, public transit, taxi, walking, and hourly car rental directions based on the travel options selected (departure time, transportation mode, more walking vs. more transfers, etc.). (Support for Android, Windows Phone, and mobile site support were withdrawn in 2013, after Apple bought the company.)
- Nearby Stations allowed users to find bus or subway stops near an address.
- The City Guide helped users find attractions, bars, hotels, restaurants, shopping areas, and other businesses.
- The Community tab offered users the ability to plan a trip with multiple destinations, including City Guide listings and custom locations.
- Transit maps and schedules.
- HopStop also calculated calories burned and per passenger carbon emissions savings for each transit route.

== Coverage ==
HopStop.com provided directions in 600 metropolitan areas worldwide, such as:

=== Canada ===
Calgary, Edmonton, Halifax, Hamilton, Montreal, Ottawa, Quebec City, Saskatoon, Toronto, Vancouver, Victoria, Waterloo, Winnipeg.

=== Europe ===
London, Moscow, Paris, St Petersburg.

=== United States ===
Akron, Albany, Albuquerque, Allentown / Lehigh, Ann Arbor, Asheville, Atlanta, Austin, Bakersfield, Baltimore, Birmingham, Boston, Buffalo, Burlington, Charlotte, Chicago (service suspended as of October 2013), Cincinnati, Columbus, Cleveland, Dallas/Fort Worth, Delaware, Denver / Boulder, Detroit, Eugene, Flagstaff, Fresno, Green Bay / Appleton, Hartford, Honolulu, Houston, Huntsville, Indiana, Jacksonville, Kansas City, Lansing, Las Vegas, Lexington, Little Rock, Long Island, LA, Louisville, Madison, Memphis, Metro North Area, Miami / S. Florida, Milwaukee, Minneapolis, Missoula, Nashua, Nashville, New Jersey, New Orleans, New York City, Norfolk / VA Beach, Oklahoma City, Orange County, Orlando, Palm Springs, Philadelphia, Pittsburgh, Phoenix, Portland / Salem, Providence, Raleigh-Durham, Reno / Tahoe, Richmond, Rochester, Sacramento, Salt Lake City, San Antonio, San Diego, San Francisco, Santa Barbara, Sarasota, Seattle / Tacoma/ Olympia, Spokane, St Louis, State College, Stockton / Modesto / Tracy, Syracuse / Oswego / Utica, Tampa, Washington D.C., Wilmington.

Transit agencies were not required to have a General Transit Feed Specification for information to be provided.
