= Eniro.se =

Swedish search portal

- Available in: Swedish
- Owner: Eniro AB
- Revenue: Advertising
- Website: eniro.se
- Registration: no
- Launched: 2003
- Current status: active

Eniro.se is a local Swedish search portal offering telephone directory, websearch and maps for Sweden. In addition to this Eniro offers a news aggregator, shopping services, video search, image search and job search. Its biggest competitor is Hitta.se who offer similar services.

It was launched in May 2003 when various Swedish web services owned by Eniro, including telephone directory, maps and the search engine Evreka, where merged into one portal. Eniro bought Gula Tidningen in 2004 and its web service, "Köp & Sälj", was soon integrated into Eniro.se. A jobfinding service was also added in 2004. A review service connected to the Yellow Pages, where users could give reviews of the listed companies, was added in 2006.

The frontpage was revamped in May 2008 with the launch of Supersök ("Super Search"). This shows search results for the business directory, residential directory, maps, images, videos and news integrated into one page.

== Maps ==
Initially, Eniro's map service only offered road maps. Satellite images where added in 2006. The resolution of the aerial photographs provided on Eniro.se is higher than the satellite images provided by international map services such as Google Maps.

In November 2007, Eniro added "Utsikt" to their map service. This function provides photos of cities taken from a 45-degree angle from four directions. The resolution is roughly 0.15 metres per pixel. Initially, only the three major metropolitan areas were available, but more cities were added during 2008. From June 2008, Eniro claims to cover 33 cities with the service.
