= Here WeGo =

Web mapping and navigation service since 2012

- The Android app as of 2025 The web app as of 2015
- Developer: HERE Global B.V.
- Release: 10 February 2007; 19 years ago (as Nokia Maps); 20 November 2012; 13 years ago (as HERE Maps)
- Stable release: 4.21.100 / 31 August 2026; 2 months ago (iOS), 24 August 2026; 2 months ago (Android)
- Operating system: Android, iOS, Tizen, Fire OS, web; Discontinued: Windows 10 Mobile, Windows Phone, Symbian, Nokia Asha, Nokia X
- Available in: English
- Website: wego.here.com

Here WeGo (stylised HERE WeGo) is a web mapping and satellite navigation software available on the Web and mobile platforms, operated by Here Technologies which is owned by Audi, BMW and Mercedes-Benz. It is based on Here's location data platform, providing its in-house data, which includes satellite views, traffic data, and other location services.

The service was originally released by Nokia as Nokia Maps in 2007 for Symbian and Windows Mobile. Nokia later acquired Navteq which provided location data and the service was also rebranded Ovi Maps under the Ovi name. In 2010, Nokia started offering the full Ovi Maps suite with free navigation and traffic information, where previously it had an annual charge. In 2011, the Nokia Maps suite (including Nokia Drive and Nokia Transit) were released on the Lumia range and was expanded to other Windows Phone products in 2012. It was then rebranded to HERE Maps and expanded to the World Wide Web and then, after Nokia sold it, to the Android platform on in 2014 and iOS in 2015. It was rebranded to HERE WeGo in July 2016.

== Features ==
HERE WeGo provides several location and mapping features including turn-by-turn navigation (including for walking and cycling) and traffic and public transport data. It can work online and offline: maps of countries and regions can be downloaded to internal storage of devices so that a data connection is not needed for navigation. Online usage is required for live traffic data and additional venue information. As of March 2017, HERE WeGo had real-time information on traffic conditions and incidents available for 63 countries.

The maps include floor-by-floor details of large indoor venues such as shopping malls and airports.

Users can save the location and details of destinations as 'Collections' if they are online and signed in. It is not possible to store destinations offline, on the device. Collections can also be shared.

=== CarPlay and Android Auto ===
If a car is equipped with a CarPlay connectivity component, the HERE WeGo application on the iPhone can be projected to the car's in-dash navigation screen and controlled as any other built-in application. Since July 2022, the beta version of the Android app is compatible with Android Auto, working with an Android phone and a car equipped with an Android Auto connectivity component in the same way that the iPhone version.

== History ==
=== 2007–2013 ===
In 2006, Nokia purchased a German start-up, Gate5, that made a mapping software called smart2go. In February 2007, Nokia announced that smart2go would be available for free on the S60 Symbian platform and Windows Mobile 5.0. It was preinstalled on handsets, including Nokia N95, which featured Global Positioning System (GPS) technology. In August 2007 the smart2go application became part of the umbrella Ovi brand, and version 1.0 of Nokia Maps was released for S60 3rd Edition devices. Months later, Nokia bought Navteq, a provider of digital map systems.

Navigation feature on Ovi Maps 3.0

Ovi Maps version 2.0 went into public beta in February 2008 and was released in May. Version 3.0 was released in July 2009.

Turn-by-turn navigation and traffic information originally required a subscription, but in January 2010 Nokia announced that these would be provided for free. In 2011 it became Nokia Maps. It was released for Nokia Lumia in November 2011, coming preloaded on the devices. Further versions for the Nokia N900 and Nokia N9 were also released.

In November 2012, Nokia rebranded Nokia Maps to HERE Maps. The rebranded version was initially released for iOS and later in February 2013 for all Windows Phone 8 devices. It was also released on the Nokia Asha platform and Firefox OS. The legacy Symbian and Series 40 versions continued using the old name without HERE branding. The web app, as of 2013, the offers routing support between many waypoints, city pages of over fifty popular cities showing local time and weather conditions, along with information from Lonely Planet and suggested places, as well as 3D maps of 25 cities, including routing support. It also offers live traffic flow visualization, public transport search, and synchronization of user's points of interest (Collections) between the website and mobile devices. Additionally, it shows heat maps to visualize areas popular for food, nightlife, shopping and local sights in select cities, listing and managing businesses. With 3D goggles, users can get stereoscopic views of 25 cities. It also provides detailed street-level imaging for many cities.

=== 2014–present ===
The HERE application was first announced for Android as a beta test version for some Samsung Galaxy smartphones on 29 August 2014. The app was made available for download from Samsung's Galaxy App Store on 8 October 2014. It was simultaneously launched for the Samsung Gear S smartwatch. The first public release of the beta Here app (across all Android platforms) was on 21 October 2014, as an APK download from the HERE.com Web site. The app became available in the Google Play Store on 10 December 2014. On 12 February 2015, a stable version of HERE Maps was released on the Google Play store.

As of June 2015, the Here app was available as a free app in 118 countries and territories across the world for the Android and iOS platforms. On 3 September 2015, Here announced that its app would be available for the Samsung Gear S2 when the smartwatch was released later that fall.

In late 2015, Facebook began using HERE's maps for their applications, moving away from Microsoft's map offering, Bing.

Ownership and operation of Here Maps changed in December 2015, when Here, at the time a subsidiary of Nokia, was sold to a consortium of German automotive companies (Audi AG, BMW AG and Daimler AG) as Here Global BV.

On 15 March 2016, HERE announced that it would discontinue support for its app for Windows 10 Mobile on 29 March 2016 due to its use of "a workaround that will no longer be effective after June 30, 2016", and that the existing Windows Phone 8 app would only receive critical updates after this date and no longer be actively developed. HERE Maps licensed by Microsoft are still offered as part of the existing Bing Maps-based software on these devices.

On 27 July 2016, the app was updated and re-branded to HERE WeGo. The update and rebranding focused on navigation capabilities, including adding taxi fare information in some cities and integrating with Daimler's Car2Go service. The other apps of the HERE suite were integrated into WeGo.

In April 2020, HERE WeGo introduced CarPlay integration for iOS.

As a response to COVID-19 delivery tools demand, HERE WeGo Delivery was launched.

== Platforms and versions ==
=== Android ===
Here WeGo runs on Android and is available for download on the Play Store, Huawei AppGallery and Galaxy Store. It is also available but no longer updated on the Amazon Appstore.

=== iOS ===
The app and service runs on iOS (currently iOS 14 and later).

=== Tizen ===
Here WeGo has been available for the Tizen running Samsung Gear S3 smartwatch and is offered on the Galaxy Store.

=== Web ===
The website wego.here.com (formerly here.com) evolved out of the maps.ovi.com and later maps.nokia.com site and provides the web companion to the HERE suite. It works on all major browsers. Users can organize their favorite places in collections and sync to mobile devices. The Web application also uses WebGL to offer 3D map views without a plugin.

=== Symbian ===
Here was available on Symbian as Nokia Maps. The last version, 3.09, included:

- Driving and walking turn-by-turn with international voice guidance
- Live traffic rerouting in some countries
- Live traffic visualization on the map in some countries
- Third-party content such as ViaMichelin and Lonely Planet
- Social networking service integration
- Support for preloading street maps for offline use
- Users can report errors in the maps (from version 3.03 except on Nokia E66 and E71 models)
- Local weather conditions by the hour and forecasts for the week
- Night View mod
- Satellite maps and terrain maps
- 3D buildings and 3D maps
- Public transport routing in some cities
- Saving of favourites
- City Lens (augmented reality) (Beta only)

Nokia had halted Symbian development by 2012. However updates to the maps themselves continued to be offered up till 2015.

The latest versions of Nokia Maps per Symbian version were:

- Version 3.09 (12 November 2012, also called Maps Suite 2.0): only for Symbian Belle phones (500, 603, 700, 701, N8-00, E7-00, C7-00, C6-01, X7-00, E6-00)
- Version 3.08 (15 November 2011) and 3.07: supported on Symbian^3
- Version 3.06 (2 December 2010): Symbian^1 (S60v5) (N97, N97 mini, X6, C6-00, 5800XM, 5235 & 5230, etc.)
- Version 3.04 (20 May 2010): Symbian S60v3 FP2

=== Asha/S40 ===
Nokia Maps for Series 40 was launched in 2011 for some new Nokia Asha devices in some markets. It was limited compared to other platforms. The maps were streamed online into the device or pre-downloaded with Nokia Suite. In some markets, the phones were sold with an SD card preloaded with local maps. The system did not support turn-by-turn navigation. Asha series phones did not have GPS receivers; positioning was done by Cell ID of the cellular network or by using the Wi-Fi positioning system.

=== Windows Phone/Windows 10 Mobile ===
Here Maps was previously offered for Windows Phone and Windows 10 Mobile until March 2016. The maps themselves have continued to be updated (at least on Windows Phone 8.1) until at least 2021.

=== Other platforms ===
Here was formerly also the default map software on Ubuntu Touch and Sailfish OS. It was also released for Firefox OS.

== See also ==
- TomTom
- Comparison of satellite navigation software
- Comparison of web map services
