= ViaMichelin =

Digital travel assistance service provider owned by the Michelin Group

Coordinates: 48.83503°N 2.24417°E

- Type: Subsidiary
- Founded: 2001; 25 years ago
- Parent: Michelin
- Website: viamichelin.com

ViaMichelin is a travel website that allows road users in Europe to design and plan upcoming trips.

ViaMichelin was launched in 2001. At that time, Michelin had been publishing maps and guides for a century.

ViaMichelin provides services designed for both the general public and businesses. ViaMichelin provides several services (maps, route plans, hotel and restaurant listings, traffic and tourist information, etc.) across media including the Internet, mobile phones, personal digital assistants (PDAs), and GPS navigation systems. ViaMichelin has operations in London, Frankfurt, Madrid, Milan, and Paris.

ViaMichelin bought Kirrio in 2005. In January 2008, it was reported that ViaMichelin had 170 employees, of whom 60 were about to be laid off.

== ViaMichelin website ==
The ViaMichelin website provides mapping coverage for 187 billion kilometres (as of 2017) of roads and streets across more than 42 European countries.

ViaMichelin offers its services in multiple languages and reports more than 400 million visitors per year to its website. Users can access a database of Michelin Guide content, which provides recommendations and ratings for over 62,000 restaurants and hotels, as well as 18,000 tourist sites. The website offers additional travel services such as real-time traffic information, weather, online car rental booking, and a regularly updated database of speed camera locations that can be downloaded for free. An online store is available that offers electronic updates for the Michelin Guide, GPS accessories, and navigation-related software (CD-ROMs, SD cards, etc.) that is compatible with third-party GPS devices and PDAs. Furthermore, ViaMichelin Labs is a website used for product testing and improvement, which includes Michelin iPhone-specific maps.

=== Reception of website ===
In 2009, Graff said the ViaMichelin website was "rather confusing". In 2011, Boxell said it was "complicated". The site was described as "useful" by Bennett in 2010 and Scales in 2013. In 2004, the site was praised by The Guardian.

== Mobile services ==
ViaMichelin mobile services were available in the United Kingdom (O2), France (Bouygues Telecom), Italy (Wind), Spain (Telefónica), Germany (E-Plus), Holland (Base), and Belgium via the i-mode portal. Users could access services that included automatic routing and travel-related address finder services, such as for hotels, restaurants, and petrol stations. ViaMichelin Mobile stopped offering mobile services at the beginning of 2007.

== Software for PDAs ==
ViaMichelin develops navigation software that is specifically designed for PDAs, providing PDA users with direct access to ViaMichelin’s route calculation and map display services, as well as comprehensive Michelin guide listings.

== GPS navigation ==
In October 2005, ViaMichelin launched its own portable GPS navigation system, which included Michelin Guide content as well as additional location-based information such as shops, petrol stations, service stations, and safety camera locations. ViaMichelin also made its traffic information service available to vehicle manufacturers.

On 11 January 2008, ViaMichelin ceased production of its GPS range to focus on its core activities.

ViaMichelin created the following GPS units:

- X-930. The user interface was criticised by Ellison in 2007.
- X-950T.
- X-960.
- X-970T.
- X-980T.
