= Intermap Technologies =

American geospatial software company

- Company type: Public
- Founded: February 25, 1997
- Headquarters: Douglas County, CO United States
- Key people: Patrick A. F. Blott, Chairman and CEO
- Number of employees: 180
- Website: www.intermap.com

Intermap Technologies (TSX: IMP) is a publicly traded company headquartered in Douglas County, Colorado, United States. Intermap provides geospatial solutions that allow GIS professionals in commercial and government organizations worldwide to build a broad range of applications. Industries such as energy, engineering, government, risk management, telecommunications, water resource management, and automotive use Intermap’s NEXTMap 3D terrain products and geospatial services.

== History ==
Intermap was formed on January 31, 1996, and commenced active business operations on September 1, 1996. On November 11, 1996, the company acquired all of the assets comprising the image mapping services division of Intera Information Technologies Corporation (IITC). Many of the senior members of Intermap’s original management team were employees of IITC. Intermap originally focused on providing 3D digital elevation maps for customers under specific contract arrangements. Typically, these projects specified areas to be mapped and were generally procured by governmental mapping and/or defense agencies.

== IFSAR Products ==
Intermap collects elevation data aerially, using aircraft equipped with Interferometric synthetic aperture radar (IFSAR) technology. Intermap’s IFSAR digital elevation model (DEM) and image products include:

- Digital surface models (DSMs). A topographic model of the Earth’s surface that includes buildings, vegetation, roads, and natural terrain features. The key benefit of the DSM is that it provides a geometrically correct base map.
- Digital terrain models (DTMs). A "bare earth" topographic model that has had vegetation, buildings, and other cultural features digitally removed, enabling users to infer terrain characteristics possibly hidden in the DSM.
- Orthorectified radar images (ORIs), a grayscale image of the earth’s surface that has been corrected to remove geometric distortions, accentuating topographic features far more than is possible with aerial photography.

The data, once processed, is included in nationwide digital elevation datasets called NEXTMap.

=== NEXTMap ===
In 2002, Intermap commenced its NEXTMap program, which is focused on collecting and processing 3D digital elevation datasets for entire countries, including Great Britain (published 2003), countries in Western Europe (completed in July 2008), the United States (completed in June 2010), and Southeast Asia. In contrast to historic mapping business models in which customers pay for the completion of specific mapping projects, Intermap is self-financing the NEXTMap program. The company then sells the use of its data through licensing agreements.

== Customers ==
The company has attained digital mapping contracts with companies across various industries and sectors, including geographic information systems (GIS), engineering, insurance risk assessment, oil and gas, environment, communications, transportation, and 3D visualization markets. In 2007, Microsoft announced a partnership with Intermap to create an enhanced version of Virtual Earth 3D for Great Britain, although that 3D product was later dropped in November 2010.
