= Hitta.se =

Swedish search engine providing directories and maps

- Available in: Swedish
- Owner: Schibsted
- Revenue: Advertising
- Website: hitta.se
- Registration: no
- Launched: 2004
- Current status: active

Hitta.se ("Find.se") is a Swedish search engine that offers telephone directory, addresses and maps.

The site was founded in June 2004. In February 2005, Hitta.se's parent company TA Teleadress Information Holding AB was bought by Aftonbladet Hierta, who owns the tabloid newspaper Aftonbladet, for 200 million Swedish krona. It has since been a part of the Norwegian Schibsted group.

For some areas they also offer photos of facades in the city centres. This service was launched in October 2005 for the metropolitan areas Stockholm, Gothenburg and Malmö. In April 2006, Hitta.se added satellite and aerial photos to their map service.

In May 2008, a new three-dimensional map service called "Hitta.se 3D" was launched. It used technology from C3 Technologies, which was part of the defence corporation Saab AB, to create a detailed three-dimensional map of Stockholm. Then the software developer Agency9 used Java to create the interface which allows one to navigate through the map. The first map covers 200 square kilometers and was created using finetuned cameras which took 60,000 pictures from an altitude of 600 meters during three days. The 3D map is initially put into a "lab" section to point out that it is still in development. The technology used is based on stereovision, as the many images taken, from different angles, have precise coordinates linked to them. The down side of using this technique over the technique used by Google Earth (where buildings are created by hand) is that transparent buildings or open structures like cranes are not rendered correctly. The system can not cope with that yet as this would require very accurate calculations.
