= 2GIS =

Russian local search company

- Type: Private
- Founded: April 25, 1999; 27 years ago
- Founders: Alexander Sysoev; Dmitriy Sysoev
- Headquarters: Novosibirsk
- Key people: Denis Guryanov, interim CEO.
- Products: Digital maps and directories
- Revenue: $59.1 million (2020)
- Operating income: $4.48 million (2017)
- Net income: $3.31 million (2020)
- Total assets: $53.5 million (2017)
- Total equity: $18.3 million (2017)
- Owner: Sberbank of Russia
- Number of employees: 4,500
- Website: 2gis.com urbi-sa.com

2GIS (also known as Urbi in Arab countries) is a Russian local search company that develops digital maps and guides of cities in Russia, Kazakhstan, Italy, Czech Republic, Chile, The UAE, Uzbekistan, Kyrgyzstan, Cyprus, Azerbaijan and Ukraine. Their headquarters are located in Novosibirsk.

As of 2021, according to company data, 2GIS digital maps covered 765 cities in operating countries, processing more than 20.5 million search queries daily. Also company said a global audience of more than 56 million monthly users.

All versions of the application are free of charge, and the company's main source of income is advertising on their website. Digital maps come in three versions: PC, Web and Mobile, including iOS and Android platforms.

2GIS (2 geoinformation system) is one of the largest Internet companies in Russia according to Forbes. In 2021, 2GIS was rated 25th in the 30 Most Valuable Companies in the Russian Internet segment rating by Forbes magazine. The estimated value of the company was $189 million.

In 2016, the Wall Street Journal named 2GIS as a recognized Russian startup targeting global markets amid Russian economic crisis and international sanctions. Mashable included 2GIS in its list of Russia's “20 hottest startups".

In June 2020, 72% of 2GIS shares were purchased by Sberbank, another 3% went to O2O Holding LLC — the joint venture of Sberbank and Mail.ru Group. Within the Sber ecosystem, 2GIS took over the development of tools for integration of its maps and directories into applications of the ecosystem and third-party companies.

== History ==
=== Emergence of DoubleGIS ===
The project originated within the Novosibirsk company Technograd Plus. It was engaged in the production of professional geographic information systems by order of NGTS and other organizations. On the mass market, "Tekhnograd Plus" offered several circulations of CDs with the map of Novosibirsk. The company also released a CD "Construction Companies and Organizations", a supplement to the newspaper "Stroyka".

In 1998, after the crisis, many customers "Tekhnograd Plus" were unable to pay for expensive development of "not the first need. There was a need to find new customers and ways to apply GIS. Moreover, a lot of pirated copies of CDs had been dispersed from the previously released ones, and it became pointless to sell them.

It was decided to release a free product that would serve as a demo version of a professional GIS. The experience with the "Stroyka" newspaper showed that the electronic directory, united with the city map, could be of interest to advertisers. Alexander Sysoev formulated the concept of the new project: free distribution and return on investment through advertising. The product was named DoubleGIS: GeoInformation System plus City Information Guide.

=== Early years ===
The first release of DoubleGIS was released on April 25, 1999. In the spring of 2001, the interface of DoubleGIS 2.0 was developed, a bit later the company's web-site was launched and an updates service appeared.

At first, the company tried to cooperate with third-party organizations - it bought databases, applied to advertising agencies, invited specialists to create a rubricator. But this practice proved ineffective. The company decided to develop its own services for each of the basic business processes. That's why in the same year of 2001 information and sales departments started to be formed.

In 2002, the DoubleGIS application was distributed free of charge on CDs to 15 thousand offices of Novosibirsk.

=== Further development ===
In 2004 the project was spun off into an independent business unit - "DoubleGIS" LLC. In the same year DublGIS opened its first branch office in Omsk, as well as concluded commercial concession agreements with partners in Tomsk, Barnaul, and Novokuznetsk. That was the moment of DublGIS expansion into Russian cities.

In 2006 the company launched online and Windows Mobile version of the guidebook. DublGIS in Novosibirsk split into a managing company and a branch to sell advertising positions.

In 2007 a franchise in Odesa and branches in Chelyabinsk and Perm were opened.

In 2007, DoubleGIS 3.0, a new version of the program with an interface in the style of MS Office 2007 is released.

In 2010, the first CodeFest IT conference is held.

In 2011, the company conducts a rebranding, as a result of which, the products are called 2GIS (DvaGIS). After 12 years after the first release, 2GIS is brought to the capital - the Moscow directory is released. Release of mobile applications for Android and iOS.

In 2012, 2GIS is released in the Italian cities of Venice and Padua. This is the first release outside of the CIS.

In 2013, the company earned 3 billion rubles, another corporate identity update takes place. Foreign expansion continues: 2GIS appears in the Czech Republic and Cyprus. An application for Windows Phone is released. The concept and interface of the new 2GIS is announced.

2014: Several more new markets, including Chile. In August 2014, a map of Dubai is released, the web version of 2gis.ua with maps of Ukrainian cities is launched.

In December 2014, the company seriously expanded its headquarters in Novosibirsk by buying half of the 22-story Sun City business center in Novosibirsk. The transaction amounted to more than 1 billion rubles, the loan for the purchase was issued by Sberbank.

2GIS headquarters in Sun City (Novosibirsk)

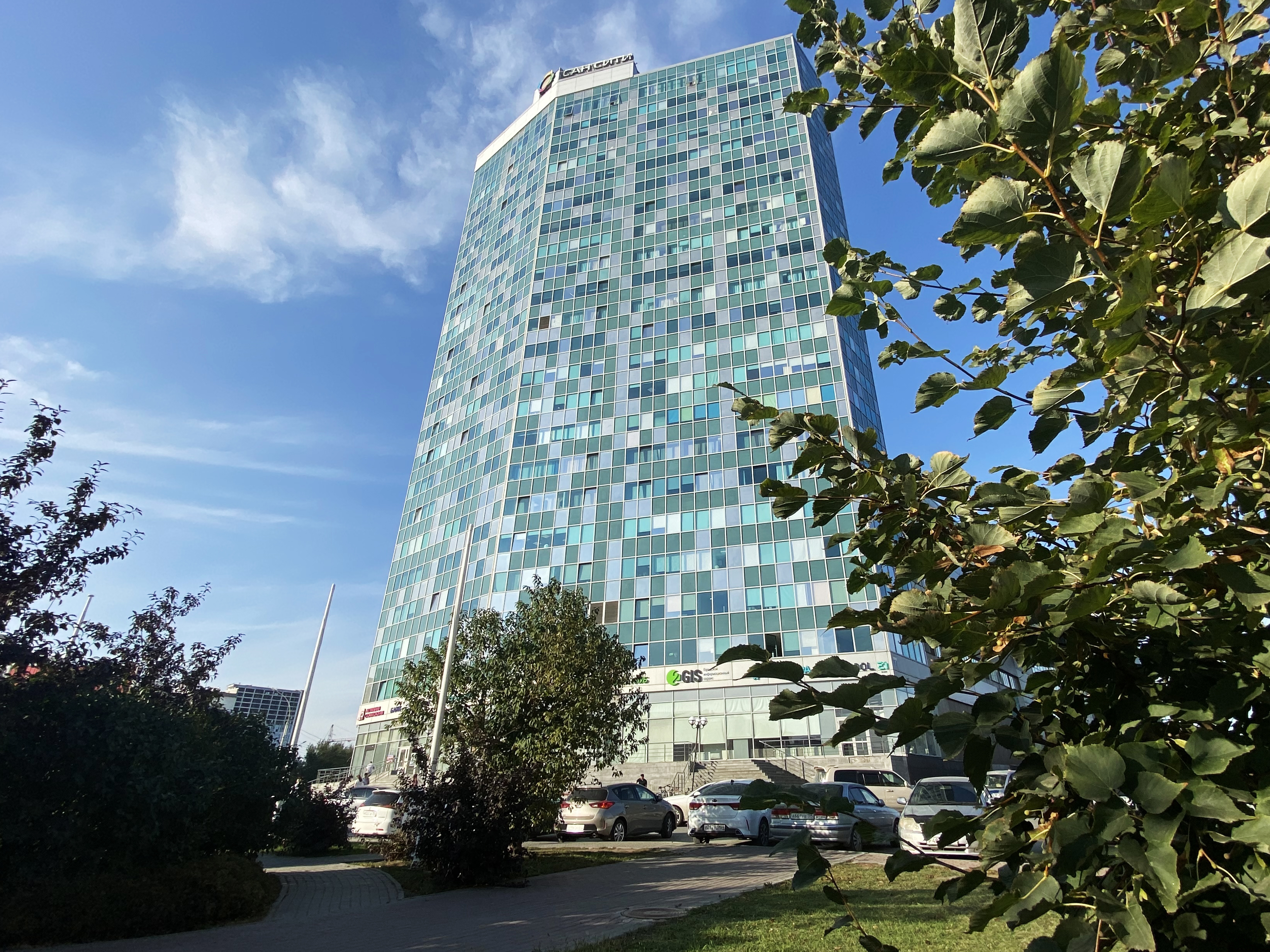

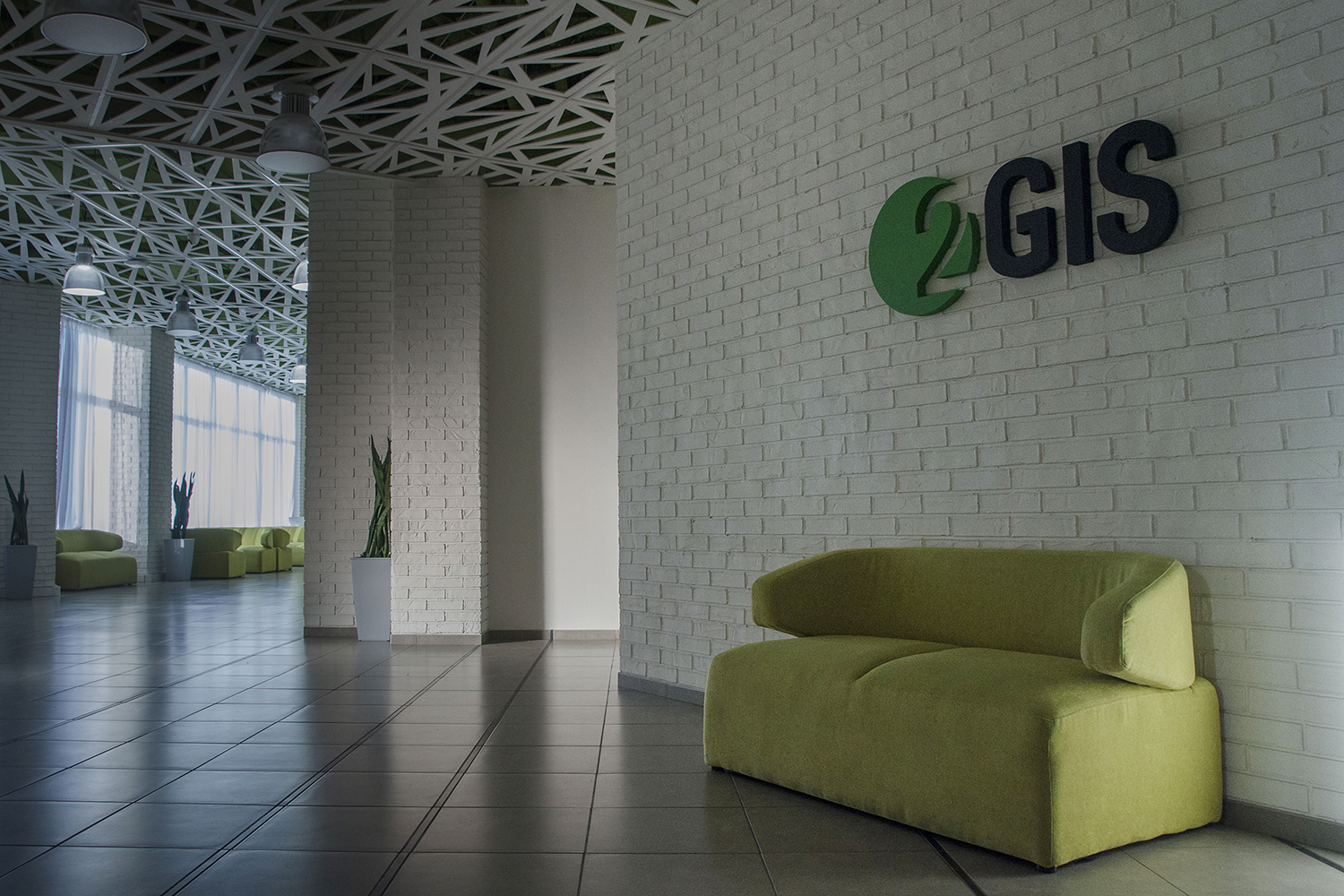

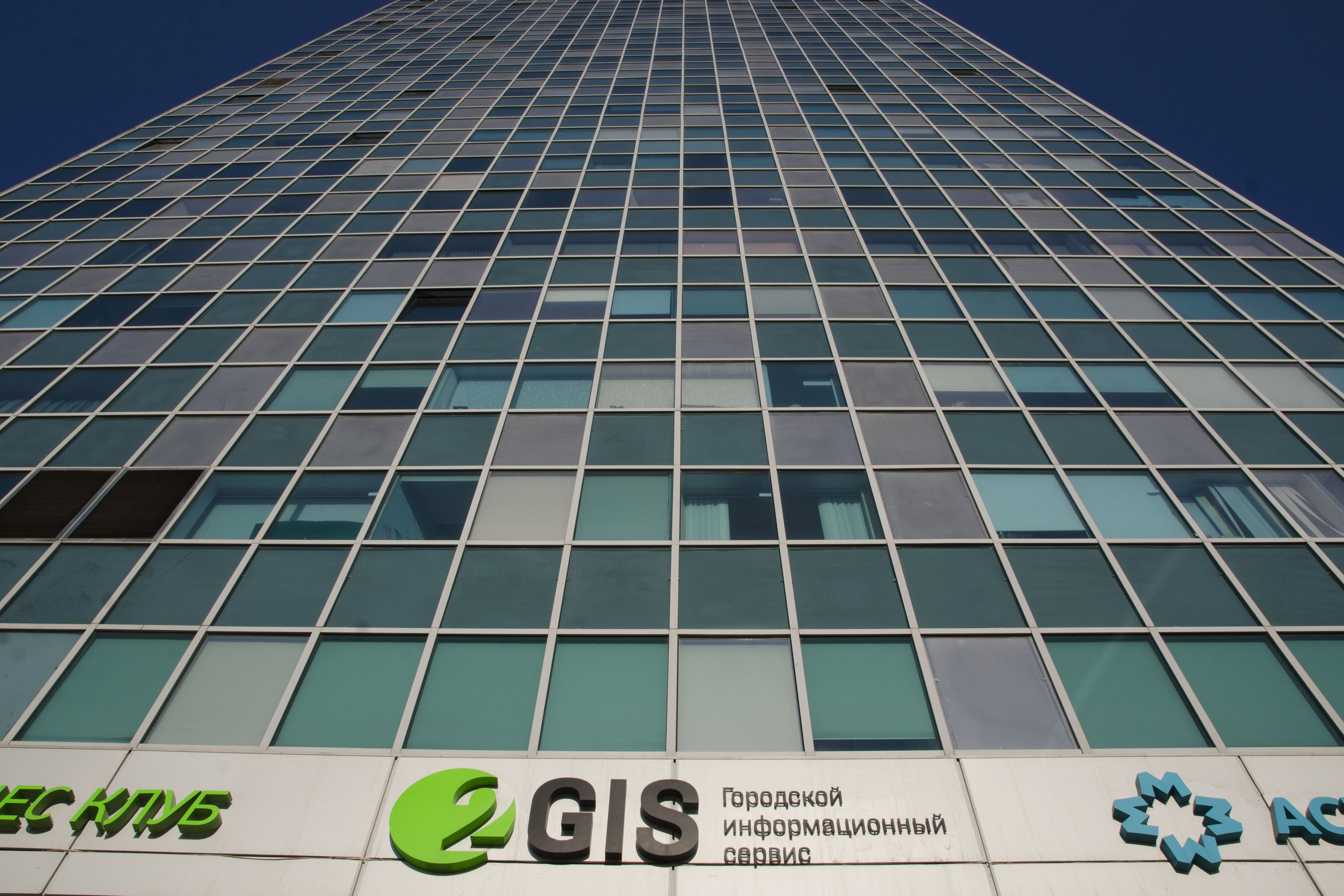

In 2015, it was included in the top ten employers in Russia according to HeadHunter. According to the results of 2020, 2GIS became the best employer in the HeadHunter rating in the "Medium-sized companies" category (the number of employees is from 251 to 1,000 people).

In October 2015, 2GIS raised equity financing for the first time. Baring Vostok and ru-Net funds allocated $40 million to the company for the development of new products, active promotion in Moscow, St. Petersburg and other major Russian cities, as well as the launch of the service in foreign emerging markets.

In November 2015, 2GIS entered Kyrgyzstan, with Bishkek as its first city of presence.

In November 2016, the company abandoned the projects that had not gained the expected audience, and optimized the staff. Vera Garmash, president of the company, said that the optimization affected less than 5% of the specialists of the management company and the network of its own branches.

In the same month, 2GIS and Rambler announced the beginning of their collaboration. Its first result was a unified search for organizations in all Russian cities on Rambler&Co sites.

In April 2017, 2GIS launched pedestrian navigation with construction of walking routes on its maps.

In July 2017, the company released travel guides for the largest cities in its countries of presence. The guides include descriptions of major attractions, dining and shopping.

In September 2017, 2GIS introduced the ability to leave reviews of companies and give them ratings. In the spring of 2019, users began to be given virtual rewards for a large number of reviews, photos and clarifications - information about changes in reference and map data that had not yet appeared in 2GIS.

In November 2017, the company entered into a cooperation agreement with the Chinese company Huawei. As a result, Huawei and Honor smartphones, which are sold in Russia, began to pre-install the 2GIS application. Earlier, LG, Fly, DEXP and Micromax started pre-installing the service on their Russian models. 2GIS has also signed similar pre-installation agreements with Samsung.

In March 2018, Apple built data on companies from the 2GIS directory into its Russian maps.

In April 2018, Road Events appeared on 2GIS maps: information about speed cameras, traffic accidents, potholes, and so on. The service allows users to publish on the map not only reports of incidents, but also their photos.

In August 2019 "2GIS" started working in Uzbekistan, the first city was Tashkent.

In November 2019, 2GIS added a global map of Russia and the ability to build a long-distance route.

In December 2019, 2GIS launched a service in Baku, Azerbaijan.

In June 2020, 72% of 2GIS is bought by Sberbank, another 3% of the company goes to O2O Holding LLC, a joint venture between Sberbank and Mail.ru Group. In the Sber ecosystem 2GIS has engaged in the development of tools for the integration of maps and a directory in the applications of the ecosystem and for third-party companies. One of the first examples of cooperation is the 2GIS map in the application of the "Samokat" express grocery delivery service.

In April 2021, 2GIS announced its investment and acquisition of 47% of the Belarusian company RocketData (legal entity - Data Deliveri LLC), which develops b2b services for managing reviews, data in online directories, on maps and in social networks.

== Products ==
=== 2GIS API ===
Toolsets for operating map and directory content. It is utilized by several 2GIS products as well as partner services. Available at dev.2gis.ru.

=== Web-version ===
Available at 2gis.ru and urbi.ae. It includes maps, directories of companies, public transport route search, pedestrian route builder, a ruler tool for distance measurement, real-time traffic jam display (in some cities). Powered by 2GIS API.

=== Mobile version ===
Available on iOS and Android. Previously supported WindowsPhone, Symbian, Windows Mobile. On September 24, 2022, the 2GIS app for iOS was removed from the App Store, as the parent company Sberbank of Russia was previously sanctioned in connection with Russia's invasion of Ukraine

=== Navigator ===
In August 2016, 2GIS released a car navigator with route directions and voice instructions, followed by the navigation for pedestrians and public transport users. Users can build routes up to the desired entrance to the building or the entrance of a residential building. Routing is available on 2gis.ru and urbi.ae websites, as well as in iOS and Android mobile apps. In June 2019, a real-time display of public transport was added to mobile apps. In December 2020, 2GIS introduced the Cargo Navigator — a navigator for freight transport that considers the vehicle parameters (e.g. dimensions, weight, axle load) for routing. The feature is available in mobile apps in Russia, as well as in several cities of Kazakhstan, Uzbekistan, Ukraine, and the UAE.

=== All Directories ===
In March 2021, 2GIS released the All Directories application — a service for businesses that provides analytics and tools for tracking user reviews and photos of their company in 2GIS. The app also features profile management tools for businesses to manage their information in 2GIS.

=== Tourism ===
On October 23, 2017, in 2GIS there were Guides to the cities of Kazakhstan. Including on Almaty. All travel guides and information about attractions and places are available offline. Until any points in the guide you can build a route by car, public transport, taxi or on foot.

== Projects in the MEG region ==
In 2018, Government of Dubai and 2GIS signed an agreement to improve maps and navigation in Dubai Now — application allowing the city's residents to access government services.

In 2020, 2GIS entered into a cooperation agreement with the Municipality of Ajman to create a city map.

At the end of the same year, 2GIS launched a separate application with maps and a directory for the United Arab Emirates (iOS}, Android) under the Urbi brand in English and Arabic languages. The service is also available at urbi.ae.

== Special projects ==
2GIS periodically launches special projects timed to coincide with some special occasions.

=== 2GIS Sochi. Winter version ===
A special edition of the 2GIS mobile version on the occasion of the 2014 Winter Olympics. Unlike the traditional mobile version, the Sochi base was immediately loaded into the app, the map and guidebook were translated into English, and the main menu of the app contained headings that were in demand by city guests.

=== Westeros map ===
For the finale of the "Game of Thrones" series, 2GIS together with Amediateka Home of HBO created a detailed interactive map of the continents of Westeros and Essos in Russian. The map was available in April–May 2019 via 2gis.ru website and iOS and Android apps.

=== COVID-19 distribution map ===
In March 2020, he launched the project "Coronavirus in Russia," which clearly showed the difference in the spread of the virus in Russian regions under quarantine and without it. A model based on a city map demonstrates two scenarios of the spread of an infection similar to the coronavirus. The service also provides current statistics on the incidence of coronavirus infection in Russian regions.

=== Russian cities recovery index ===
In 2020, 2GIS prepared an index of Russian cities' recovery after the lifting of restrictions imposed in connection with the COVID-19 pandemic. The index was calculated based on the mobility and activity of city residents, as well as the demand for various goods and services, and was regularly updated.

=== MAKS-2021 ===
In July 2021, 2GIS prepared a detailed map of the MAKS-2021 air show and marked on it all the infrastructure at Zhukovsky airport, including aircraft parking lots at the static exhibition.

== 2GIS Data ==
The company states that it adheres to 95% data accuracy standards. These indicators are ensured by cartographers, who verify maps on the ground, and by the contact center, which updates the information in the reference book.

For each organization in the directory, the address, telephone number, office hours, Internet address, and the location of the entrance to the building are listed. In addition, the so-called company card may contain information specific to the type of business of the organization. For example, payment methods, types of cuisine (for catering facilities), list of services, etc.

Information in the directory on available organizations is updated twice a year by contact center specialists. On the basis of their own data, the company's specialists periodically conduct research. For example: rating of popular destinations for domestic tourism in Russia, research on economic recovery after removal of restrictions due to COVID-19, cost and rate of sale of housing on the secondary market, dynamics of development of catering and retail trade, differences in search queries of iOS and Android users.

The 2GIS search engine can find organizations by query not only in Russian, but also in the languages of other countries where the project is present. It also finds buildings by "popular" names (for example, on request "Leninka" in Moscow, the directory will offer information on the Russian State Library).

2GIS maps are rendered on the basis of satellite images of the territory and are verified by pedestrian specialists. Three-dimensional models of buildings are made on the basis of images of the structure from several angles.

2GIS was the first Russian electronic map company to collect information about the location of entrances to organizations.

In 2014, "Floors" appeared in 2GIS: detailed interior layouts of shopping centers, airports, and train stations. For the first time, Etazhy was launched with the plans of six shopping centers in Moscow.

== Events and educational activities ==
Since 2010, 2GIS has held the CodeFest IT conference, the largest in the eastern part of the country. 2GIS also holds thematic meetings of IT specialists called DevDay. The event features 2-3 speakers and 50-100 participants.

In July 2021, 2GIS, together with Sber, opened the "School 21" campus in Novosibirsk, an educational project for training IT specialists. The Novosibirsk campus was the third in Russia after Moscow and Kazan.
