= Mapy.com =

Offline map and navigation app for Android & iOS

Mapy.com: maps & navigation

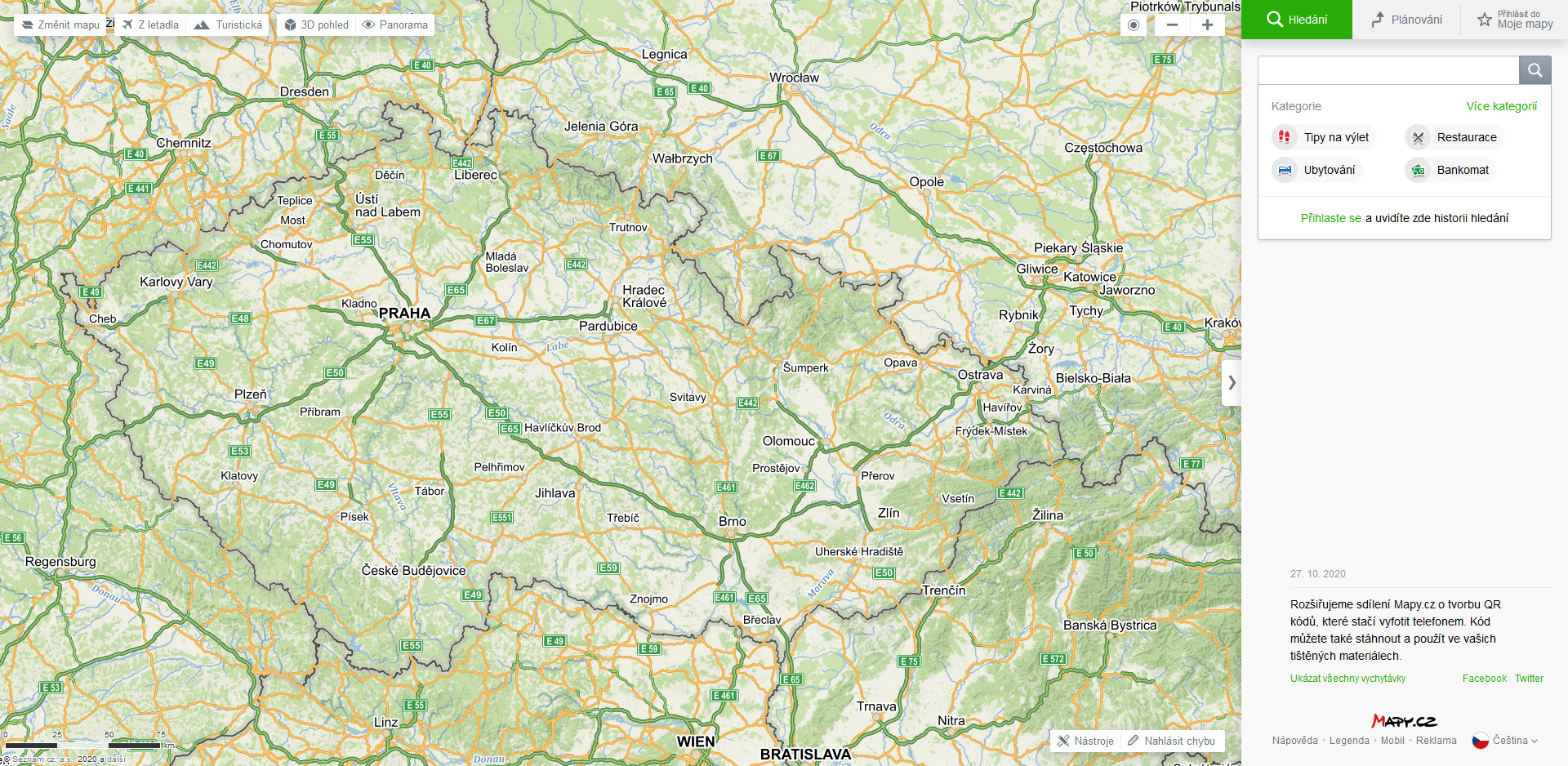
- Developer: Seznam.cz
- Release: 1998
- Operating system: web, Android, iOS
- Website: mapy.com

Mapy.com (until May 2025 Mapy.cz) is a map portal and mobile app that covers the entire world. It is available in multiple languages.

The map of the Czech Republic is based on proprietary map data, while maps for the rest of the world are created using data from OpenStreetMap and many other sources. The app's features include a route planner for driving, cycling, hiking and other modes of transportation. It also offers a vast number of points of interest with text descriptions from Wikipedia and other sources, as well as user-uploaded photos. Mapy.com is popular for its global hiking maps.

The web application is available in eight languages: Czech, English, German, Italian, Slovak, Russian, Ukrainian and Polish. The mobile app offers additional languages, including French, Spanish, Portuguese, Dutch, Hungarian, Norwegian, Danish, Turkish, Romanian and Greek.

As of June 2025 Mapy.com offers live traffic information in 9 countries: Austria, Croatia, Czech Republic, Germany, Hungary, Italy, Poland, Slovakia and Slovenia.

Mapy.com is the most popular mapping application and map portal in the Czech Republic and Slovakia, and it is becoming increasingly popular in other countries such as Poland, Germany or Italy. Mapy.cz has won numerous professional and user-choice awards in the Czech Republic and other countries. For example, in 2024, it won the 'Deutscher App Award' in the category of Hiking Route Apps.

The vast majority of features and content are free. However, as of December 2024, Mapy.com introduced a premium version that includes additional features.

== OpenStreetMap data ==
Mapy.com has been a long-time contributor of content to OpenStreetMap. and, since 2024, a Silver Corporate Member of the OpenStreetMap Foundation.
