= Here Technologies =

Netherlands-based mapping data company

HERE Global B.V.
- Trade name: HERE
- Formerly: Karlin & Collins, Inc. (1985–87); Navigation Technologies Corporation (1987–2004); Navteq (2004–11); Nokia (Location & Commerce) (2011–12); Nokia (HERE) (2012–15)
- Type: Private
- Industry: Mapping data GPS navigation software
- Founded: 1985; 41 years ago (as Navteq); 2012; 14 years ago (as Here)
- Headquarters: Eindhoven, Netherlands
- Area served: Worldwide
- Key people: Mike Nefkens (CEO); Adeel Manzoor (CFO); Denise Doyle (Chief Data Officer)
- Owners: Volkswagen Group (2015–present); BMW (2015–present); Mercedes-Benz Group (2015–present); Intel (2017–present); Mitsubishi Corporation (2019–present); Nippon Telegraph and Telephone (2019–present); Continental AG
- Number of employees: 9,000 (2019)
- Parent: Navteq (1985–2007); Nokia (2007–2015)
- Website: www.here.com

Here Technologies (stylised and trade name as HERE and here) is a multinational group based in the Netherlands specialised in mapping technologies, location data, and related automotive services to individuals and companies. It is majority-owned by a consortium of German automotive companies (namely Audi, BMW, the Mercedes-Benz Group) and American semiconductor company Intel, while other companies also own minority stakes. Its roots date back to U.S.-based Navteq in 1985, which was acquired by Finland-based Nokia in 2007.

Here captures location content such as road networks, buildings, parks and traffic patterns. It then sells or licenses that mapping content, along with map related navigation and location services, to other businesses such as Alpine Electronics, Garmin, BMW, Oracle Corporation and Amazon.com. This third-party licensing constitutes the core of the firm's business. The company is also working on self-driving technology.

In addition, Here provides platform services to computers and smartphones through the Here WeGo app (formerly Nokia/Ovi Maps). As of 2013 it has maps of about 200 countries, offers voice guided navigation, provides live traffic information, and has indoor maps available for about 49,000 unique buildings in 45 countries. Here provides location services through its Here applications, and also for GIS and government clients and other providers, such as Microsoft Bing (from 2012 through 2020), Meta Platforms, Yahoo! Maps, and the Samsung Gear S2 (and earlier models) mapping app.

== History ==
Here has built its mapping and location business by acquiring location technology; the company is a combination of what was formerly Navteq and Nokia Maps.

=== Navteq ===
Navteq was an American company founded in 1985 as Karlin & Collins, Inc., later known as Navigation Technologies Corporation and eventually as Navteq. At the time of its acquisition by Nokia, Navteq was the largest maker of automotive-grade map data used in car navigation equipment.

In October 2007, Nokia acquired Navteq for $8.1 billion. Nokia ran Navteq's business along with their own Nokia Maps (later known as Ovi Maps, then again as Nokia Maps from 2011). The two divisions remained as separate entities of Nokia Corporation until Navteq was amalgamated into the core Nokia operations in 2011 as part of their Location & Commerce unit. The service was rebranded as HERE in 2012, bringing together mapping, location businesses, satellite navigation, and other services under one brand.

=== Nokia Maps ===
Nokia Maps began in 2001 as Smart2Go, a generic 3D-map interface for access to tourist information on mobile terminals. It was developed by an EU consortium named TellMaris. Nokia gained the rights to the software when it acquired Berlin-based route planning software company Gate 5 in August 2006, which then became the cornerstone for the company's mapping business. It then made the Smart2Go application free to download and it was rebranded to Nokia Maps. Later it expanded the suite with additional location services. The service was rebranded as HERE in 2012, bringing together mapping, location businesses, satellite navigation, and other services under one brand.

=== Acquisitions and development under Nokia ===
In 2008, Nokia picked up the geosocial networking site Plazes and the following year it bought mobile applications developer Bit-Side, social location pioneer Plum, and social travel service Dopplr. In 2010, it acquired MetaCarta, a leading enterprise local search service used by security and military.

In April 2011, Nokia released a beta version of 3D maps that covered 20 cities in the world. By August 2011, the coverage had expanded to 23 cities, and in 2012, Nokia bought EarthMine, which specializes in street level 3D image capture.

In May 2011, Ovi Maps was renamed to Nokia Maps when Nokia streamlined its services offering.

In October 2011, Maps & Drive for Windows Phone 7 (Mango) was announced, which was available on Nokia Lumia phones (710, 800 and in 2012, the 900). However, major features such as off-line routing and text-to-speech navigation of street names, compared to the Symbian version, were absent. These features were eventually brought over to the Windows Phone platform in 2012.

=== Rebranding to HERE ===
On 13 November 2012, Nokia announced that it would rebrand its location offering as HERE to highlight its vision for the future of location-based services and its belief in the importance of mapping.

In June 2014, Here announced that it had acquired Medio, a Seattle-based start-up that specialized in predictive analytics.

In 2014, Windows Phone's low market share, as well as the end of Nokia's partnership with Microsoft, led to the company prioritizing Android and iOS development.

Here launched the HERE beta app for Samsung Galaxy smartphones in August 2014. Later in October the app became available on all Android devices running on 4.1 Jelly Bean or higher.

The HERE app was re-launched for iOS 8 platform on 11 March 2015.

=== German car makers' ownership ===
On 3 August 2015, here was sold to a consortium of German carmakers: Audi, BMW, and Daimler AG. On 4 December 2015, the consortium completed the acquisition for €2.8 billion (US$2.9 billion). As of December 2015 the company had 6,500 employees.

In December 2016, Navinfo, Tencent and GIC Private Limited (the Singapore sovereign wealth fund) agreed to buy a 10% stake in Here. But in September 2017, the offer of the three companies failed, as US authorities did not authorize the transaction.

In January 2017, it was reported that Intel was taking a 15% stake in the firm. In September 2017, HERE and Pioneer Corporation reached an agreement in which HERE would acquire approximately 3% of Pioneer's stock at a value of €17.3 million. In parallel, at the same cost, Pioneer would acquire less than 1% of Here.

In January 2018, Continental and Bosch acquired a 5% stake in HERE.

In December 2019, Mitsubishi Corporation and NTT of Japan acquired a 30% stake in HERE. Upon completion of the transaction, HERE had nine direct and indirect shareholders: Audi, Bosch, BMW Group, Continental, Intel Capital, Mitsubishi Corporation, Mercedes-Benz, NTT and Pioneer.

In November 2017, Here announced it would acquire Advanced Telematic Systems for an undisclosed amount.

In January 2018, Here announced it would acquire indoor mapping company Micello for an undisclosed amount.

== Current ownership ==
The German consortium of Audi, BMW and Daimler initially held a 44% stake in the company.

- (Japan) Mitsubishi and NTT (30%) (via holding company COCO Tech Holding B.V.)
- (United States) Intel (15%)
- (Germany) Bosch (5%)
- (Germany) Continental (5%)
- (Japan) Pioneer (1%)

== Automotive services ==
=== HERE Auto ===
The 2016 Jaguar Cars XF and XJ models incorporate HERE map technology drive guidance in their in-car infotainment systems. All of the features of the HERE suite are available to the driver, including maps, navigation, and social sharing using Glympse. Another feature of HERE Auto is the ability to plan the journey from the Android or iOS app before entering the car. Country and region maps are also able to be downloaded directly to the flash-based storage of the HERE Auto system itself, much like the ability to store offline maps on devices using the Android/iOS HERE apps.

=== HERE MapCare ===
HERE MapCare was first implemented with Volvo vehicles in 2009 and has since spread to at least 23 other manufacturers (such as Hyundai, Mazda and Mitsubishi) utilizing HERE maps data in their infotainment systems. HERE map data is updated for a period of around three years from the date of purchase of the vehicle and is performed at the time of service from the car dealer. There is also the option of updating maps data via USB memory stick or memory card.

=== Here and other car manufacturers / mapping companies ===
HERE maps data and technologies are also integrated into the technologies of other car companies:

- Garmin has been using HERE for its mapping system since the days it was branded as Navteq. With its recent models of Garmin GPS navigation units, HERE has facilitated and used DAB to broadcast live traffic information for free to users. This is done through the power cable of the GPS unit acting as an antenna, and provides enough data with low latency, allowing data to be updated in very fast intervals and without having to resort to using SIM cards and paying for mobile data plans.
- MyFord Mobile from the Ford Motor Company has its location services powered by HERE mapping data, allowing users to find their parked cars remotely from the relevant iOS or Android app. Routes for driving are also able to be planned on the phone itself and sent to the car ready to be enacted. Charging station locations for electric vehicles already inherent in the HERE mapping database are also included in the calculation of routes to be driven.
- Mercedes-Benz adopted HERE HD Live Map in its technology Drive Pilot, an SAE International level 3 of levels of driving automation as announced in 2021.
- BMW adopted HERE HD Live Map in its technology Personal Pilot, an SAE International level 3 of levels of driving automation as announced in 2023.

Here also has a presence at major motor trade shows around the globe. For example, at the Mondial de l'Automobile 2014 show in Paris, HERE had its maps in 50 of the 62 cars on show. HERE also attends other major trade shows such as CES in Las Vegas.

=== New technologies ===
Here also conducts work on various new technologies to improve traffic, mapping and the experience of driving. Listed below are recent prominent examples of these:

In August 2015, Here introduced a new traffic-jam warning system called Traffic Safety Warning. The system works in alerting the driver with a suitable time period to react to the fact that there is a traffic jam up ahead. Data is updated every minute and is yet another way in which data collected is used to the benefit and safety of drivers.

In June 2015, Here published an interface specification named the Sensor Ingestion Interface Specification. This standard defines how sensor data gathered by vehicles on the road can be sent to the cloud to update maps on the fly. The premise of the technology is to allow for the collection of data to alert other cars on the road to traffic obstacles or accidents in the vicinity. HERE has called for leading car manufacturers from across the world to promote its specification and call for a standardized data format, thereby leading to all consumers receiving the same traffic data reporting.

Here also works in the field of automated vehicles, with the recent provision of its high-definition map data for manufacturers in testing their vehicles. The mapped data of private test tracks provides these cars with a highly accurate navigation system to complement data collected from on-board sensors. Much like existing map data is collected for consumer driving, the same LiDAR technology is used to map these private test tracks along with the roads that are used for public testing. HD Map data is also considered accurate, with accuracy to a level of 10 to 20 centimeters, and the collection of lane geometry is also part of the data collection task. Here makes approximately 2.7 million changes to its global map database every day.

Also part of the field of autonomous vehicles and automated driving is the Live Roads technology. HERE is currently developing a technology that will be able to alert drivers of conditions such as weather to alert other drivers of possible hazards, or to avoid a particular area whilst driving. An example is the aggregation of data from windshield wipers and slipping tires to notify other drivers to avoid an ice-filled area. The company is also investigating Humanized Driving where data is collected on driving habits on roads, and provisioning this data to allow automated cars to follow how drivers behave (speed, traffic lights, etc.) when driving on certain roads.

Here has also worked with SWARCO Group (in German) in developing technologies for speed guidance. Through the provision of traffic lights and management, traffic congestion and vehicle efficiency will be improved.

== Consumer services ==
=== HERE WeGo ===
HERE WeGo, formerly Nokia Maps and HERE Maps, is a consumer mapping application that works on smartphones or through a web browser. It is currently available in 196 countries and its features include turn-by-turn walking navigation, offline availability, 3D landmarks and indoor Venue Maps for 100,000+ unique buildings in 87 countries. A favorites list shows the top 25 most popular places in the vicinity looking at positive reviews, search queries and other user data. The application is also integrated with an augmented reality technology called LiveSight that lets users hold up their phone to reveal information about the buildings including contact information, hours and reviews in their line of sight from the phone camera display.

In November 2012, Here announced the decision to open up its location platform to all operating systems so that anyone with any kind of device could access it. With an open platform HERE broadens its reach and acquires more users, which in turn generates more data for its location cloud. Here developed a Here Maps API for Android which is available to partners. Apps built with the Here Android API will be able to interact with extruded 3D buildings, search for specific buildings and preview their routes in detail.

In November 2012, Here created an HTML5-based web service for iOS. The free app provides iPhone users with maps in almost 200 countries as well as public transit, walking and driving directions. Voice guided navigation is available for walking directions. It also provides multiple map views including a satellite view, public transportation view and live traffic view. HERE Maps on iOS received lukewarm praise mostly because it was a web application and not a native one. HERE Maps for iOS got multiple bad reviews from the start stating it was "a mess", "a wreck", "unfinished", "buggy" and "rushed out HTML5-powered turkey". It was pulled from the App Store in December 2013, after having not been updated for 10 months. The Here web site was offered as replacement, however, as of December 2014, Here noted that they plan to "officially launch HERE for iOS in early 2015." Here was re-launched as a true app designed for iOS application on 11 March 2015. Some of its retailing and commercial density maps are the result of its partnership with the for-profit, business mapping observatory EIXOS.

=== HERE Map Creator ===
HERE Map Creator is a service launched in November 2012 to allow users to update the HERE map. The service is available for more than 100 countries and in 47 languages. It can be accessed from their website mapcreator.here.com and dedicated HERE Map Creator Android and iPhone apps.

Users are able to add new roads (trails are included here), edit a road or remove it, add a new place, edit a place or remove it and finally add a house number, edit or remove it. In addition, users can edit road details such as speed limits, number of lanes, one- or two-way, type "open road", "tunnel" or "bridge", pavement type, etc. and also add local shops and businesses into various categories such as grocery store, clothing store, types of restaurants (including cuisine and name of food joint), and sports equipment store, among several other categories and subcategories, and give various details about them including photos, telephone numbers, addresses, hours and days of operations in a week, payment info in the shops (whether they accept cash, cards, discount coupons or not). Users can also report map changes. Tutorial videos and instructions to carry out the editing operations are available on their website.

=== Here XYZ ===
Here launched in beta a cloud-based geospatial data management platform in 2018, aimed at providing consumers, in particular map developers, a storage and rendering platform for uploaded location datasets. Here XYZ was noted as having similarities to Carto Builder from CartoDB.

=== Former products ===
==== Here on Windows ====
Here makes its location-based assets, such as offline maps, available for the Microsoft Windows platform through a dedicated Windows SDK.

Because the suite runs on Windows, users can save their favorite destinations as live tiles to their start screen and the app will calculate routes based on current location. The suite is integrated so that users can access individual functions going from one app to the next without going back to the home screen. Favorites are saved to the cloud so that they can be accessed on all of the different applications.

In February 2013, Nokia announced that HERE Maps, HERE Drive and HERE Transit would be available on all Windows devices at the Windows Store.

==== Here Drive ====
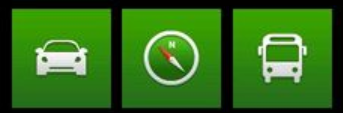
Icons of the Nokia Maps suite in 2012 (Nokia Drive, Nokia Maps, Nokia Transit)

The HERE Drive app provided navigation designed for in-car driving in 94 countries. Its features include visual and audio speed limit warnings, voice-guided turn-by-turn navigation with spoken street names (optional) in more than 60 countries in 50 different languages and offline availability. The user interface is designed for drivers, and map data includes 260 attributes such as turn restrictions, physical barriers and one-way streets. HERE Drive and HERE Drive+ have optional live traffic information where available, but both lack dynamic rerouting, which is restricted to everyday commuting in a few countries only and then does not come with voice guidance. HERE Drive is now integrated into the HERE WeGo app.

==== Here Transit ====
HERE Transit was a public transportation service covering more than 700 cities in 50 countries. It combined bus, train, ferry, tram and walking information in one application. It was released in 2012 as Nokia Transit or Nokia Transport for Nokia Lumia before being developed for other platforms. HERE Transit shut as a standalone app and it integrated into HERE WeGo.

==== Here City Lens ====
Demonstrating HERE City Lens on a Nokia Lumia 920, with its PureView camera

HERE City Lens is augmented reality (AR) software that gives dynamic information, through the phone's camera display, about users' surroundings such as shops, restaurants, and points of interest, shown as virtual signs overlaid on or above buildings. A commercial beta version was released in 2013.

It also has free of charge turn-by-turn voice-guided navigation, HERE Drive 3.0 (earlier Nokia Drive), which can also be used without an Internet connection using preloaded maps. It is also possible to de-clutter the surroundings: version 1.5 has a "Sightline" feature where users can narrow their view to just what is in the direct line of sight, making it easier to spot interesting places.

HERE City Lens is powered by Bing Maps, and Nokia introduced HERE Prime Place for listing. The newest release has 3D icons and the ability to disable places which are not within the camera's line of sight.

On 15 March 2016, HERE announced that it would discontinue support for its app for Windows 10 Mobile on 29 March 2016 due to its use of "a workaround that will no longer be effective after June 30, 2016", and that the existing Windows Phone 8 app would receive only critical updates after that date and no longer be actively developed.

== Enterprise services ==
=== Utilization of HERE services ===
HERE provides mapping data and assistance to many customers in the enterprise sector. One of these services powered by HERE mapping data and geocoding is the FC.FrameLogic fuel control system by FrameLogic, which uses fuel probes installed in the vehicle fuel tank to detect discrepancies and ultimately save from three to ten percent on their fuel expenditures. Another company making use of Here data is MapMechanics, whose Truckstops VRS solution engages Here real-time traffic and historical data patterns to plan ahead and factor in events such as transit strikes, to in turn re-route drivers. Sygic is another truck company that uses Here map data for its truck navigation software, depending on its accuracy and reliability. Other pertinent examples of companies using Here for their services are Aramex, TimoCom, we-do-IT, Amadeus, Maps4News and Baidu.

=== HERE Traffic Analytics ===
In July 2015, HERE launched HERE Traffic Analytics, which helps companies to plan for the effects of traffic on projects such as road construction. With the giant silo of data available, HERE has made current and retrospective data available for business customers to be constructed, tailored and extracted to the customers' requirements. Giving such granular control over the data allows for customers to use this data for the purposes they require, and the amount of detail and control needed for projects.

=== HERE Mobile SDK and HERE Data Lens ===
The HERE Mobile SDK was launched in February 2014, and in the time since has expanded to add more functionality for developers. There are many customers using HERE mapping data as the backbone for their mobile apps, and the SDK provides access to information such as average road speeds, traffic build-up, and maximum loads that can be transported on a particular road. There have been even more features and access added in each iteration of the SDK, with the latest 3.0 version launching in mid-2015. In the Here Mobile SDK Starter Edition 3.0, there are native Android and iOS APIs for raster tile map display, online points of interest search, geocoding/reverse geocoding and online pedestrian/car route calculation. Here Mobile SDK Premium Edition 3.0 extends the functionality to include vector maps, turn-by-turn guidance, truck routing, 3D venue maps and augmented reality. Offline Enterprise Maps (for truck attributes and congestion zones) and LiveSight pedestrian guidance are also provided in this latest version of the SDK. HERE Data Lens is another service launched by HERE whereby customers can visualise their usage of data on a map in a visual form. This pictorial representation provides for extended analysis of datasets and how they are being used.

== Content delivery ==
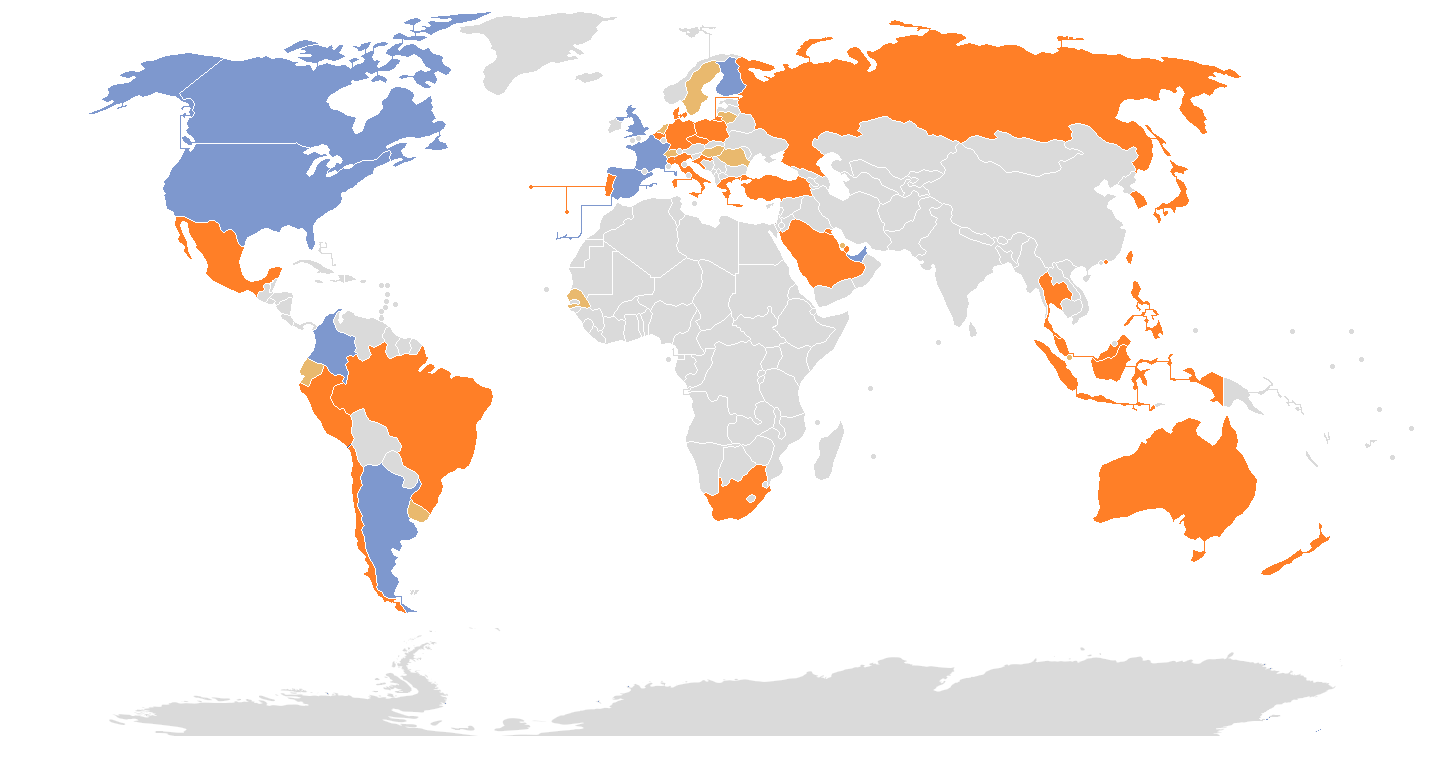
Coverage of street-level views in HERE Maps in 2015. Partial coverage (blue) and "full or partial coverage planned" (orange).

HERE draws on more than 80,000 data sources including a vehicle fleet, which collects data through panoramic cameras, position sensors and laser technology for 3D footprints. The cars have an array of cameras, which capture 360-degree street views, and lidar sensors, which capture 1.3 billion data points every minute. Another bank of high-resolution cameras capture signs such as speed limits and street names. In November 2012, Nokia acquired Berkeley-based company Earthmine to further bolster its 3D street-level imagery processing capabilities. In addition, HERE relies on local source data and input from map users to generate constant daily map updates, such as real-time traffic, turn by turn directions, public transportation routes and information about local business and attractions.

By 2013, four out of five cars globally with fully integrated in-dash navigation systems used HERE data. HERE supplies map content for Alpine, BMW, Mercedes, Garmin, Hyundai, Pioneer, Volkswagen and Toyota, among other car companies and enterprises.

HERE also provides mapping data for popular apps to find and order taxis. These apps include Easy Taxi, MetroView and Grab Taxi, among others.

== Platform partnerships ==
HERE licenses its location platform to other major companies, including Amazon, Bing, Yahoo!, Flickr, SAP and Oracle. Each partner uses the HERE location platform, which is available to any business or screen, to optimise experiences for its own users depending on the particular context. Amazon, for example, uses the HERE platform for maps and geocoding, in Amazon Maps. In 2012, the platform computed 11 billion traffic probes a month, 80 million geocoding requests daily, 24 million route requests a day and more than 1 billion search queries in a year.

== See also ==
- Comparison of web map services
- Nokia Networks
- Nokia Technologies
- Nokia
