= Turn-by-turn navigation =

Feature of GPS navigation devices

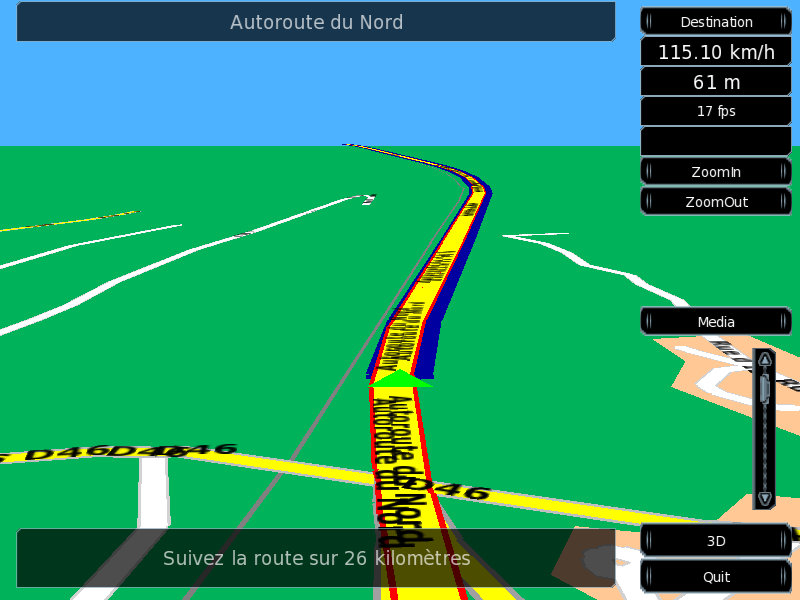
Navit turn-by-turn navigation

Turn-by-turn navigation is a feature of some satellite navigation devices where directions for a selected route are continually presented to the user in the form of spoken or visual instructions. The system keeps the user up-to-date about the best route to the destination, and is often updated according to changing factors such as traffic and road conditions. Turn-by-turn systems typically use an electronic voice to inform the user whether to turn left or right, the street name, and the distance to the next turn.

Mathematically, turn by turn navigation is based on the shortest path problem within graph theory, which examines how to identify the path that best meets some criteria (shortest, cheapest, fastest, etc.) between two points in a large network.

== History ==
Real-time turn-by-turn navigation instructions by computer was first developed at the MIT Media Laboratory by James Raymond Davis and Christopher M. Schmandt in 1988. Their system, Backseat Driver, monitored the car's position using a system developed by NEC that communicated over a cellular modem with software running on a Symbolics LISP Machine at the Media Lab. The computer then used a speech synthesizer to compute appropriate directions and spoke them to the driver using a second cellular phone.

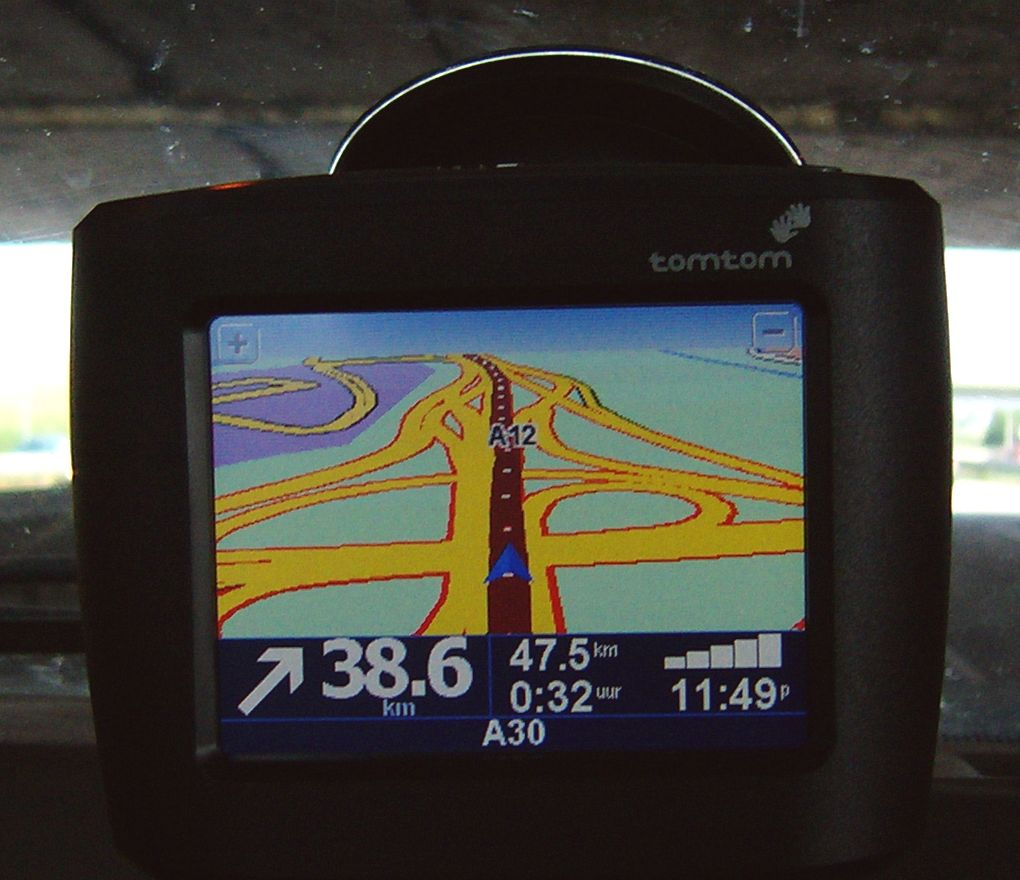
A TomTom device

== Devices and services ==
Major mapping services that offer turn-by-turn navigation, grouped by map data provider:

- Google:
  - Google Maps, a free online navigation app by Google for Android, iOS and KaiOS
  - Waze, a free app providing turn-by-turn navigation on Android, iOS and Windows
- HERE Technologies:
  - HERE WeGo, a free online and offline navigation app for Android, Fire OS and iOS
  - Garmin, road portable navigation devices, car built-in navigation devices
  - Genius Maps, a paid online and offline turn-by-turn navigation app for Android, HarmonyOS and iOSHERE also provides mapping capabilities for automobile makers like Audi and Volkswagen
- OpenStreetMap. Offline-capable applications that use volunteer-contributed data:
  - CoMaps free privacy-focused offline app, open-source + community - Android, iOS, macOS, Linux
  - Karta GPS, a free online and offline navigation app for Android and iOS
  - Locus Map, a free online and offline navigation app for Android
  - Magic Earth, a proprietary, free online and offline navigation app for Android, Fire OS and iOS
  - Maps.me, a free offline app for Android and iOS
  - Mapy.com, a freemium online and offline turn-by-turn navigation app for Android, iOS (with synchronization between the web version and app)
  - Organic Maps, a free and open-source offline map and navigation app for Android, iOS, iPadOS, macOS and Linux
  - OsmAnd, a free online and offline navigation app for Android, Fire OS and iOS
- Scout GPS Link for Android and iOS
- Apple Maps, uses OpenStreetMap data in countries that do not have their "new map", in countries such as the Philippines. Apple also has data teams that contribute to OpenStreetMap.
- TomTom, uses OpenStreetMap on their AmiGO (now, "TomTom") map, combining it with their own data.
- Other:
  - Sygic GPS Navigation, a paid offline turn-by-turn navigation app for Android and iOS (map data based on Here, TomTom, OpenStreetMap and Sygic Maps)
- TomTom:
  - TomTom car, motorcycle and truck portable navigation devices, car and truck built-in navigation devices, Android and iOS smartphones and tablets online and offline through AmiGO
  - Apple Maps, a free online navigation app for iPhone and iPad using iOS 6 or later uses TomTom data for live traffic. Apple Maps used to use TomTom for map data, but transitioned to OpenStreetMap after issues with TomTom such as the issue with Airfield Park in South Dublin being mapped as an airport.
  - Petal Maps, a free online and offline navigation app for Android 7 or later, HarmonyOS and iOS
  - Windows Maps, a free online and offline navigation app for Windows

== See also ==
- Waypoint
