= Comparison of free off-line satellite navigation software =

This article contains a list with gratis (but not necessarily open source) satellite navigation (or "GPS") software for a range of devices (PC, laptop, tablet PC, mobile phone, handheld PC (Pocket PC, Palm)). Some of the free software mentioned here does not have detailed maps (or maps at all) or the ability to follow streets or type in street names (no geocoding). However, in many cases, it is also that which makes the program free (and sometimes open source), avoid the need of an Internet connection, and make it very lightweight (allowing use on small portable devices, including smartphones). Very basic programs like this may not be suitable for road navigation in cars, but serve their purpose for navigation while walking or trekking, and for use at sea. To determine the GPS coordinates of a destination, one can use sites such as GPScoordinates.eu and GPS visualizer.

Some software presented here is free, but maps may need to be paid for. In this instance, and in the instance that some maps (of specific countries) are not standardly available, Mobile Atlas Creator (MOBAC) can be used (e.g. on OruxMaps, Maverick, Sports Tracker, Maplorer).

Some of the software mentioned can also be run on different devices than what they are intended for. A particular case-in-point is the Android software which can often be run on laptops or PCs (running Linux, Windows or Mac OS X) as well. This can be done using emulators.

Some of the software mentioned here may run only on devices that are no longer commercially sold (such as the PalmPilot and PocketPC devices). However, these devices are often still obtainable via second-hand websites.

== Navigation software ==
=== Free maps ===
Navigation software with free maps often uses maps from the OpenStreetMap project.

Name	Company or developer	Type of device	Operating system	Software with maps? Follows streets?	Open source?	Remarks
Aqua Map	GEC	smartphone, tablet	Android, iOS	Yes, yes	No	
CoMaps	CoMaps	smartphone, tablet	Android, iOS	Yes (OpenStreetMap data), yes	(Apache License 2.0)	Privacy-focused navigation - no location tracking and no data collection. For hiking, cycling and driving. Developed by the community as a free and open-source project under a co-op not for profit organization.
Google Maps	Google	smartphone, tablet, laptop (online), PC (online)	Android, iOS	Yes, yes	No	Maps can be downloaded, but they expire after 30 days, ads
Here WeGo	HERE Global B.V., Netherlands	smartphone, tablet, laptop (online), PC (online),	Android, iOS	yes (color maps), ?	No	intended for marine navigation
Magic Earth	Magic Lane Ltd.	Smartphone, tablet	Android, iOS	Yes (OpenStreetMap data), yes	No	Free OSM maps intended for car navigation, hiking and biking
MapFactor	MapFactor, s.r.o., Czech Republic	smartphone, tablet, laptop (online), tablet PC, car navigation	Android, iOS, Windows, WinCE, Windows Phone 8.1, Windows 10 Mobile	Yes (OpenStreetMap data), yes	No	Free OSM maps, optional non-free TomTom maps, ads
MAPS.ME	MapsWithMe GmbH	smartphone	Android, BlackBerry, iOS	Yes (OpenStreetMap data), yes	No	?
Mapy.com	Seznam.cz	smartphone, tablet, laptop (online), PC (online), car navigation	Android, iOS	Yes, yes	No	Car, hiking, cycling, skiing and boating navigation with web and app sync. 1 free offline map, unlimited offline maps for Premium users.
Navmii (formerly NavFree)	Navmii	smartphone, tablet, PC	Android, BlackBerry, iOS	Yes (OpenStreetMap data), yes	?	?
NaviComputer	?	Windows Phone	Windows Mobile	yes (?), no	?	For hiking and biking
Navit	none	smartphone, tablet, laptop (online), PC (online)	Android, Linux, OpenMoko, Windows for PC	Yes (OpenStreetMap and others), yes	(GPLv2)	Intended for road navigation
OpenCPN	?	laptop, PC	IntelMac, Linux (Fedora, Ubuntu, CentOS),Windows XP SP3, Vista, 7, 8	yes (various charts and OpenStreetMap data), N/A	GPL	Intended for maritime navigation
OsmAnd	OsmAND bv	smartphone, tablet	Android, iOS	Yes (OpenStreetMap data), yes	(GPLv3+)	Limited to 7 maps for the free Google Play version, unlimited on F-Droid; Maps can be added manually via PC in program order on smartphone
OSM Scout for Sailfish OS	Karas Lukáš	smartphone	Sailfish OS	Yes (OpenStreetMap data), yes	(LGPL)	Unlimited offline maps loaded from within the app.
Organic Maps	Organic Maps	smartphone, tablet	Android, iOS	Yes (OpenStreetMap data), yes	(Apache License 2.0)	Privacy-focused navigation - no location tracking and no data collection. For hiking, cycling and driving. Developed by the community as a free and open-source project.
Pure Maps + OSM Scout Server	rinigus	smartphone	Linux, Sailfish OS, UBports	Yes (OpenStreetMap data), yes	(GPLv3)	Pure Maps acts as frontend and OSM Scout Server as backend. Unlimited offline maps loaded from within OSM Scout Server.

=== Non-free maps ===
Name	Company	Type of device	Operating system	3rd-party GPS-able?	Software with maps? Follows streets?	Open-source?	Remarks
Argo Navigation	Argo Navigation	Smartphone, Tablet, PC	Android, iOS	?	Yes, yes	No	Marine navigation app with autoroutine, customizable nautical charts, crowdsourced data, and offline maps (paid).
Aqua Map	GEC	Smartphone, tablet	Android, iOS	?	Yes, yes	No	
i-Boating	i-Boating	Tablet, PC, Smartphone	Android, Embedded Linux & BlackBerry, iOS, Mac OS, Windows	Yes	Yes	No	Marine Navigation Software, free program, but maps need to be paid for
HandMap	?	handheld PC (Palm)	Palm OS	?	yes (color maps, basic), ?	?	May be a free program, but maps need to be paid for (hence called "shareware" at Tucows) ?
Navionics Boating App	Navionics	smartphone, tablet	Android, iOS	?	yes (OpenStreetMap data), ?	?	Intended for marine navigation, free program, but maps need to be paid for
SailPalm	?	handheld PC (Palm)	Palm OS	?	yes (black and white maps), ?	?	Free program, but maps need to be paid for (hence called "shareware" at Tucows), intended for marine navigation (sailing)

== Other satellite navigation software ==
Name	Company	Type of device	Operating system	3rd-party GPS-able?	Software with maps? Follows streets?	Open-source?	Remarks
FieldNote	Mobile Computing	handheld PC (pocket PC)	Windows CE	?	no, ?	?	mainly intended to mark specific points without a map, not intended for actual navigation
GPSLogger	Open Project Basic Air Data	Tablet, PC, Smartphone and any android enabled device	Android	Yes, no specific hardware	No	GPLv3	Free and no ads. Exports in common formats and via email
osmdroid	osmdroid.org	Tablet, PC, Smartphone and any android enabled device	Android	Yes, no specific hardware	yes (?), no	Apache	may not allow actual navigation from point-to-point, only showing the current position on a map

== Miscellaneous / unsorted software ==
Name	Company	Type of device	Operating system	3rd-party GPS-able?	Software with maps? Follows streets?	Open-source?	Remarks
Maverick	?	Tablet PC	Android	?	yes (OpenStreetMap data), ?	No	?
gvSIG Mini	Prodevelop	Tablet PC	Android	?	yes (OpenStreetMap data), ?	GPL	?
OpenSatNav	Kieran Fleming et al.	Tablet PC	Android, OpenMoko	?	yes (OpenStreetMap data), ?	?	?
Minimap	?	Tablet PC	Android	?	yes (OpenStreetMap data), ?	?	?
MapDroyd	CloudMade Deutschland GmbH	Tablet PC	Android	?	yes (OpenStreetMap data), ?	?	?
OruxMaps	?	Tablet PC	Android	?	yes (OpenStreetMap data), ?	No	?
AlpineQuest Off-Road Explorer	Psyberia	Tablet, PC, Smartphone and any android enabled device	Android	?	yes (?), ?	No	Since 2010.
AndNav 2	?	Tablet PC,	Android	?	yes (?), ?	?	?
Big Planet Tracks	?	Tablet PC,	Android	?	yes (?), ?	?	?
Sports Tracker	Sports Tracking Technologies	Tablet PC	Android,	?	yes (?), no	No	Does not allow navigation to specific points, only tracking
RMaps	?	tablet PC	Android	?	yes (?), ?	?	may not provide actual navigation, only marking of GPS points, and the current position
AFTrack	?	Tablet PC, handheld PC (Symbian)	Android, Symbian OS series 60	?	yes (?), ?	?	?
CacheBox	?	Tablet PC, PC, handheld PC (pocket PC)	Android, Windows Mobile, Windows for PC	?	yes (?), ?	?	initially intended for geocaching
Mapopolis	?	Handheld PC (Palm)	Palm OS	?	yes (black and white maps), ?	?	only has maps for USA
Magellan Nav Companion	?	handheld PC (Palm)	Palm OS	?	yes (OpenStreetMap data), ?	?	?
TZGPS	?	handheld PC (Palm)	Palm OS	?	yes (OpenStreetMap data), ?	?	?
Trax	Luke Klein-Berndt	handheld PC (Palm)	Palm OS	?	? (?), ?	?	?
SoaringPilot	?	handheld PC (Palm, some PocketPC/WinCE devices)	Palm OS	?	yes (OpenStreetMap data), ?	?	Originally intended for use in sailplanes
CotoGPS	?	handheld PC (Palm)	Palm OS	?	? (?), ?	?	Originally intended for geocaching
GpsPilot	?	handheld PC (Symbian One)	Symbian	?	no (?), ?	?	?
Maplorer	?	handheld PC (pocket PC)	Windows CE, Mobile	?	yes (?), ?	?	?
OSMtracker	?	handheld PC (pocket PC), smartphone	Android, Windows Mobile	?	yes (?), ?	GPLv3	?
gpsVP	?	handheld PC, certain smartphones	Windows Mobile 5,6, 2003	?	yes (OpenStreetMap data), ?	?	?
CacheWolf	?	Laptop, PC	Windows, Mac OS X, Linux	?	yes (?), ?	?	?
Glopus	?	Laptop, PC, handheld PC (Pocket PC)	Windows, ?	?	yes (?), ?	?	?
TrekBuddy	?	PC, laptop, handheld PC (Palm, Symbian, BlackBerry), Windows Phone	Android, Symbian, Palm OS, SE proprietary OS, Windows Mobile, Windows XP, Vista,	?	yes (?), ?	?	Runs on Java, hence cross-platform
gvSIG 2.0	?	PC, laptop,	Windows XP, Vista, Linux, OS X	?	yes (?), ?	?	cross-platform; originally intended as a GIS; however can be fitted with GPS receiver and has support for it and also allows to easily download maps from any location from an online database as OpenStreetMap, and many others
LuckyGPS	?	Laptop, PC, smartphone	Windows, Linux, OpenMoko	?	yes (?), ?	?	?
Mumpot	?	Laptop, PC, smartphone	Linux, OpenMoko, GPE	?	yes (?), ?	?	?
Pyroute	Ojw	Laptop, PC, smartphone	Windows XP, Linux, OpenMoko	?	yes (?), ?	?	?
TangoGPS	Marcus Bauer	Laptop, PC, smartphone	Linux, OpenMoko	?	yes (?), ?	?	?
FoxtrotGPS	?	Laptop, PC	Linux, OpenMoko	?	yes (?), ?	?	based on TangoGPS, actively being developed, especially adapted for use with touch screens
Rana	Ojw	smartphone	OpenMoko, Neo Freerunner	?	yes (?), ?	?	runs on Python, so possibly cross-platform
BikeAtor	?	smartphone (OpenMoko, Symbian), tablet PC	Android, OpenMoko, Symbian	?	yes (?), ?	?	?
Osmarender	?	laptop, PC	, Linux, OS X, Windows	?	yes (OpenStreetMap data), ?	?	Not intuitive
Mobile Trail Explorer	?	smartphone, ?	Symbian, multiple OSs	?	yes (?), ?	?	Runs on Java, so a cross-platform GPS navigation software
Open Citymap	?	smartphone (Qt)	Windows CE, OpenMoko	?	yes (?), ?	?	?
Mappero	?	Nokia N810	Maemo	?	yes (OpenStreetMap data), ?	?	?
NaviPOWM	?	handheld PC, Laptop, PC	Windows for PC, Windows Mobile 5/6/2003 SE, Linux	?	yes (OpenStreetMap data), ?	?	?
GPSS	Robin Lovelock	Laptop or Pocket PC	Windows for PC, Windows Mobile	?	yes (can import)	No	Since 1995. www.gpss.co.uk
NaVisu	?	Laptop, PC	Linux, OS X, Windows	?	yes (OpenStreetMap data), ?	?	Developed for marine applications, not intuitive, built around NASA WorldWind
Cetus GPS	Cetus software	embedded system (Garmin)	OS 5	?	yes (?), ?	?	?
GPS interpreter	Marcel Durieux, Christian Tavernier	Embedded system (purpose-build PCB)	?	?	yes, ?	?	?
Andrew Holme's GPS software	Andrew Holme	Embedded system (several custom PCB's + Raspberry Pi)	Raspbian Linux	?	?, ?	?	?
AdvRider WD	Adi Barda	Android	Android	?	yes (can import)	No	Since 2013.
TheGOAT	?	Tablet PC	Android	?	yes (OpenStreetMap data), ?	No	?

== See also ==
- Comparison of satellite navigation software
- Comparison of web map services
