= Comparison of satellite navigation software =

This is a list of notable commercial satellite navigation software (also known as GPS software) for various devices, with a specific focus on mobile phones, tablets, tablet PCs, (Android, iOS, Windows).

Name of application	Maps source	Operating platform	Software license	Cost	Maps can be preloaded (and stored)	3D navigation mode	Voice-guidance	Live traffic	Speed traps	Other feature (remarks)
Apple Maps	OpenStreetMap, Automotive Navigation Data, Getchee, Hexagon AB, IGN, Increment P, Intermap Technologies, LeadDog, MDA Information Systems, Waze, TomTom	iOS, macOS, watchOS	Non-free proprietary	Free	Yes	Yes	Yes	Yes	Yes	Lane guidance; CarPlay
BlackBerry Maps	Unknown	BlackBerry 10	-	Free	No	Yes	Yes	No	No	
CoMaps	OpenStreetMap	Android, iOS, Linux	Apache 2.0 (except some 3rd party libs and resources)	Free	Yes	Yes	Yes	No	Yes	Offline navigation; Privacy-focus; OpenStreetMap editor; Elevation charts; CarPlay, Android Auto; Developed by the community as a free and open-source project.
Google Maps	TomTom, Zenrin, AutoNavi, Geocentre Consulting, Google Map Maker, SK telecom, ORION-ME, INEGI, AfriGIS (Pty) Ltd, Inst. Geogr. Nacional, GeoBasis-DE/BKG, Mapa GISrael, GBRMPA	Android, iOS	Non-free proprietary	Free	Yes (expire after 30 days)	Yes	Yes	For certain countries	Yes	Lane guidance; Android Auto; CarPlay
GraphHopper	OpenStreetMap	Android, iOS, Raspberry Pi	Apache 2.0	Free; Paid subscription fee for hosted directions API	Yes	Yes	Yes	No	Yes	Vehicle tracking
HERE WeGo	HERE	Android, iOS, Tizen Watch, Huawei	-	Free	Yes	Yes	Yes	Yes	Country dependent	Venue maps; Lane guidance; 3D landmarks; Android Auto
iGO	TomTom, HERE and Top-Map	Android, iOS, Windows Mobile	-	Freemium	In-App purchase	Yes	Yes	Yes	Yes	Green routing; Lane guidance
Karta GPS	OpenStreetMap	Android, iOS	Non-free proprietary	Freemium	Yes	Yes	Yes	In-App purchase	In-App purchase	Lane guidance; Recommended places from Yelp and Foursquare; Places description, photos, reviews and opening hours; ETA sharing
Locus Map Free	OpenStreetMap, Swisstopo, IGN, Outdooractive, Freytag&Berndt, SHOcart, others	Android	Non-free proprietary	Free	Yes	No	Yes	No	No	Focused on outdoor navigation – hiking, biking, geocaching
Locus Map Pro	OpenStreetMap, Swisstopo, IGN, Outdooractive, Freytag&Berndt, SHOcart, others	Android	Non-free proprietary	Paid	Yes	No	Yes	No	No	Focused on outdoor navigation – hiking, biking, geocaching
Magic Earth	OpenStreetMap	Android, Fire OS, HarmonyOS, iOS	Non-free proprietary	Freemium	Yes	Yes	Yes	For certain countries	Yes	Lane guidance; Elevation charts; Wikipedia links; Weather info; CarPlay and Apple Watch support; Online and offline navigation; Can run in the background
MapFactor	TomTom, OpenStreetMap	Android, Windows, Windows Phone	Non-free proprietary	Freemium	Yes	Yes	Yes	In-App purchase	Yes	Lane guidance
Maps.me	OpenStreetMap	Android, iOS, BlackBerry	Non-free proprietary	Free	Yes	Yes	Yes	Yes	Yes	OpenStreetMap editor; Booking.com; Elevation charts; CarPlay; Offline navigation only; Can't run in the background
Mapy.com	OpenStreetMap, Seznam.cz and others	Android, iOS	Non-free proprietary	Freemium	Free: 1 country; Unlimited downloads for Premium users	Yes	Yes	In 9 countries	Yes	Car, hiking, cycling, skiing, boating online and offline navigation with web and app synchronization; Android Auto and CarPlay; Lane guidance; Report hazards; Public transit (in some countries); Photos, opening hours and Wikipedia links; Booking.com; Places and routes shared via email, Facebook, Twitter, QR or link; Elevation charts; 3D terrain of whole Earth; Weather info
Moovit	OpenStreetMap	Android, iOS	Non-free proprietary	Free	No	No	No	No	No	
Navigon	HERE	Android, iOS, Windows Phone	-	Paid	Yes	Yes	Yes	In-App purchase	Yes	Lane guidance; Apple Watch; Pedestrian navigation; Drive and ETA sharing
Navmii	OpenStreetMap	Android, iOS	Non-free proprietary	Freemium	Yes	Yes	In-App purchase	In-App purchase	In-App purchase	
Organic Maps	OpenStreetMap	Android, iOS	Apache 2.0 (except some 3rd party libs and resources)	Free	Yes	Yes	Yes	No	Yes	Offline navigation; Privacy-focus; OpenStreetMap editor; Elevation charts; CarPlay, Android Auto; Developed by the community as a free and open-source project.
OsmAnd	OpenStreetMap	Android, iOS	GNU GPLv2 (except some 3rd party libs and resources)	Freemium; Paid subscription for all of the features	Free: up to 7 downloads; In-App purchase for unlimited downloads (also unlocks all of the features except for contour lines, hillshade maps and nautical depth contours)	No	Yes	No	No	Lane guidance
OsmAnd+	OpenStreetMap	Android, iOS	GNU GPLv2 (except some 3rd party libs and resources)	Free: As OsmAnd~ on F-Droid; Paid: On Google Play and the App Store; If bought from Google Play or the App Store, a paid subscription for maps that are more detailed	Yes	No	Yes	No	No	Lane guidance
Ovi Maps	HERE / Nokia	Symbian OS S60, Maemo	-	Free: Last Nokia and Navigator phones; Paid: Other phones	Yes	Yes	Yes	Yes	No	Pedestrian navigation
Petal Maps	TomTom, HERE, OpenStreetMap, Zenrin	Android, HarmonyOS	Non-free proprietary	Free	No	Yes	Yes	Yes	Yes	Transit; Lane guidance; HUD mode; 3D landmarks
Trip4YouMaps	OpenStreetMap, Maptiler, CyclOSM, WaymarkedTrails	Android, iOS, Web	Non-free proprietary	Free	No	No	No	No	No	Cycling (normal, racing, MTB), walking, hiking & car navigation; Roundtrip planning; Show way surface, way type and incline/decline on map; Places and routes shared via browser share; Elevation charts, synchronised with map; POIS
Sygic: GPS navigation	TomTom, HERE, others	Android, iOS, Windows Phone	Non-free proprietary	Freemium	Yes	Yes	In-App purchase	In-App purchase	In-App purchase	CarPlay; MirrorLink (paid version); Lane guidance; Dashcam recorder; Pedestrian navigation
TomTom	TomTom	Android, iOS	Non-free proprietary	Free for 75 km/month; Paid subscription	Yes	Yes	Yes	Paid subscription	Paid subscription	CarPlay; Lane guidance
Waze	Waze	Android, iOS, Windows Phone	Non-free proprietary	Free	Limited control over stored data; Can be used for off-line navigation	Yes	Yes	Yes	Yes	Crowdsourced traffic, road hazard, route data used in route algorithms; CarPlay; Gas-stations and prices; Drive and ETA sharing; Report hazards; Temporary Closures (roadwork/events/...)
Windows Maps	HERE	Windows 10 Mobile, Windows 10, Xbox One Microsoft HoloLens	Non-free proprietary	Free	Yes	Yes	Yes	Yes	No	Cortana integration
Yandex Maps	Yandex.Map editor	Android, iOS, Windows Phone	Non-free proprietary	Free	Yes	Yes	Yes	Yes	Yes	Lane guidance; Places description, photos, reviews and opening hours
Name of application	Maps source	Operating platform	Software license	Cost	Maps can be preloaded (and stored)	3D navigation mode	Voice-guidance	Live traffic	Speed traps	Other features and remarks

== Discontinued ==
- Garmin Mobile XT; (compatible with Symbian)
- Mapopolis Navigator

== See also ==
- Comparison of free off-line satellite navigation software
- Comparison of web map services
