= Magic Lane =

Dutch navigation product company

Magic Lane Ltd. (formerly Route 66)
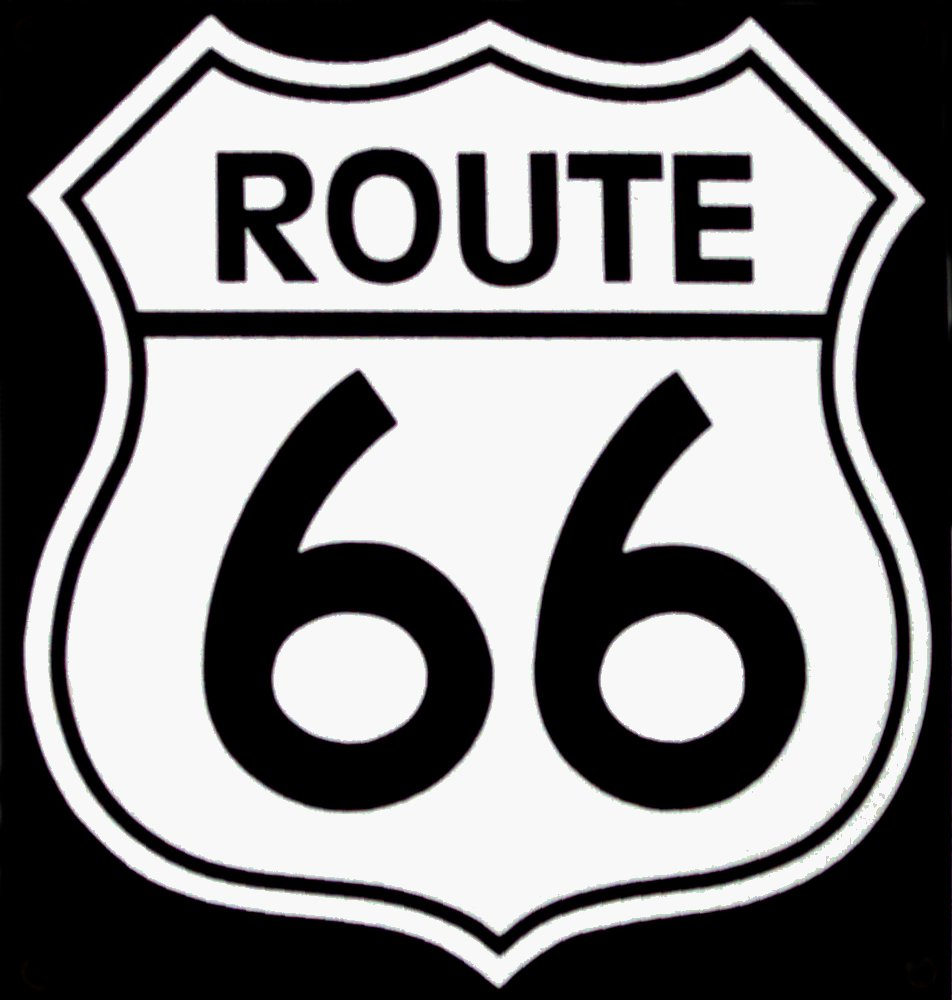
- The company's logo was the road sign of the Route 66 highway
- Type: Private
- Industry: GPS navigation devices
- Founded: 1992 / 2022
- Products: Navigation software Navigation hardware
- Website: magiclane.com

Magic Lane Ltd. (formerly Route 66 Geographic Information Systems B.V.) is a privately held company headquartered in Amsterdam, the Netherlands. Route 66 was founded in 1992 and specialized in navigation software for PC and mobile devices (PocketPC). and released for iOS and Android devices in 2015. The company has been rebranded as General Magic in 2018 and then again rebranded in 2022 to the current name, Magic Lane Limited, in part as a continuation of the Magic Earth brand as well as a reference to the founder and CTO Johan Lanen.

Magic Lane is the developer of Magic Earth, a common proprietary navigation application, first developed by Route 66 in 1999 for PC and mobile devices (PocketPC) and released for iOS and Android devices in 2015. It is now developed by the Dutch company Magic Lane. In 2016, Route 66 Navigate was discontinued and replaced by the pro version of Magic Earth. Notably, since 2018 it has been included as the default navigation application for the /e/ Operating System, a privacy-focused alternative to Android for smartphones.

== Route 66 ==
Route 66 was founded in 1992. In 1999 the company opened a software development center in Brașov, Romania. In 2005 the company moved all its research and development operations to the aforementioned location, which at that date employed 45 of the company's total of 65 employees. In 2008, the company announced 2.4 million euros in revenue. In 2010, the company had 92 employees, of which 65 were software developers.

The Nokia 6110 Navigator delivered with Route 66 was the first mobile phone with on-board navigation installed as standard, apart from smartphones with their significantly larger dimensions and heavier weight.

The current founder of Magic Lane previously developed the Route 66 route planner in the 1990s, which was among the first navigation products for Macintosh, PC, and early mobile phones. They established General Magic to rebuild their software, focusing on privacy, offline functionality, lightweight hardware usage and multi SDK support. Their end user product was Magic Earth, which was used as a testing ground for their developments on Android and iOS platforms.

=== Route 6 Navigate ===
In November 2013, Route 66 launched Navigate 6.

The continuation of Route 66 Navigate was carried out after the company rebranded as General Magic, with the introduction of the navigation app Magic Earth as a testing ground for Android and iOS, made first available in 2015 on Android.

In 2016, Route 66 Navigate was discontinued completely and replaced by the pro version of Magic Earth.

== Magic Lane Ltd. ==
Magic Lane Ltd. was founded in 2022 in Amsterdam, the Netherlands, as a continuation of Route 66. It provides a platform to other companies enabling navigation for their apps and platforms. Magic Lane's Software Development Kit (SDK) allows companies to add mapping, location, and navigation functionality into vehicles, apps, and online platforms in several programming languages. The SDK is for iOS, Android, JavaScript, QT, Linux, Flutter and C++.

Magic Lane's datacenters are located in Europe.

=== Magic Earth ===
Magic Earth is built on OpenStreetMap (OSM) data with a focus on privacy and around 2,000 data sources to calculate routes for pedestrians, cars and bicycles. It also provides turn-by-turn navigation for driving, biking, walking, and public transportation. The application also works offline, with offline OSM data for 233 countries and regions. It can display 2D, 3D and satellite maps as well as location data for parking and details like route surface, difficulty and elevation. Navigation includes speed camera alerts, live traffic updates, and speed warnings in supported regions. The app also includes a speedometer that remains on even when not navigating. Magic Earth works on Android and iOS devices and supports Android Auto, Apple CarPlay and Apple Watch integration.

Magic Earth does not collect personal data. Revenue is generated through a subscription fee of €0.99/year and developer SDK sales. The /e/ Operating System, which aims to be a privacy-focused alternative to Android, uses Magic Earth as the default navigation application, with the explanation that Magic Lane provided the /e/OS developers sufficient documentation about privacy behavior to include the application in the OS.

The application is sometimes confused with Magic Earth Inc., a gas and oil industry data visualization software company.

== See also ==
- Comparison of satellite navigation software
- OpenStreetMap
- OsmAnd
- Organic Maps
- CoMaps
- DeGoogle

== Other sources ==
- Lim, Andrew (February 28, 2006). "Route 66 Mobile 7: Use your mobile for satellite navigation". Crave.cnet.co.uk.
- Catanzariti, Ross (May 10, 2007). "330 Auto Navigation". Pcworld.idg.com.au. Archived from the original on October 3, 2009.
- Noordhuis, Maaike (February 18, 2011). "TomTom Falls 11% on 'Broadly Flat' Earnings Forecast". Bloomberg. Archived from the original on March 26, 2011.
- Virki, Tarmo (September 15, 2010). "HTC unveils new smartphones, pushes into services". Reuters.
- https://wiki.openstreetmap.org/wiki/Magic_Earth#Resources
