= Karta GPS =

Free satnav application for smartphones

- Developer: Karta Software Technologies Lda
- Release: 2016

Stable release(s)
- iOS/iPadOS: 2.41.01 / February 20, 2023; 3 years ago
- Android: 2.42.01 / February 23, 2023; 3 years ago
- Operating system: Android; iOS 11 and later; iPadOS 11 and later
- Available in: 26 languages
- List of languages English, Arabic, Czech, Danish, Dutch, Finnish, French, German, Greek, Indonesian, Italian, Japanese, Korean, Malay, Norwegian Bokmål, Polish, Portuguese, Russian, Simplified Chinese, Slovak, Spanish, Swedish, Thai, Traditional Chinese, Turkish, Vietnamese
- Type: GPS navigation software
- License: Commercial proprietary software
- Website: kartagps.com

Karta GPS is a mobile application developed by Karta Software Technologies Lda., a daughter company of NDrive, for the Android, iOS and iPadOS operating systems. It is distributed for free and pairs open-source map data from OpenStreetMap alongside curated content from Yelp and Foursquare.

The application does not require a connection to the Internet and uses a GPS satellite connection to determine its location. Routes are calculated and plotted based on real-time traffic information provided by Inrix.

== History ==
The application's beta release was released on 4 November 2016. On 19 May 2017, Karta GPS featured both Bill Clinton and Donald Trump's voices in its selection of navigation voice overs.

== Features ==
- Offline maps and guidance: All maps can be downloaded for free. No internet is required for searching, route calculation or turn-by-turn instructions.
- Search: One-box search supports partial names and initials. It can search points of interest, GPS coordinates and address points.
- Traffic: The application shows the route layered with different colors based on the current traffic along the route.
- Suggestions: Point of interest content drawn from Yelp and Foursquare to Karta GPS maps, allows users to "explore" a location's top-rated places of entertainment, their descriptions, their last three reviews, photos, and their opening hours and prices.
- Car & Walking provides navigation for both cars and pedestrians.

== See also ==
- Comparison of commercial GPS software
