= Sygic =

Slovak automotive navigation technology company

Sygic a.s.
- Industry: GPS navigation software
- Founded: 2004; 22 years ago
- Headquarters: Bratislava, Slovakia
- Area served: Worldwide
- Key people: Michal Stencl (founder); Martin Strigac (CEO 2018-2024); Stefan Janciga (General Manager 2025-present
- Products: GPS Navigation & Maps Sygic; Sygic Truck GPS Navigation; Sygic Professional Navigation; Sygic Navigation for Automotive
- Number of employees: 190+
- Website: www.sygic.com

Sygic (/ˈsaɪdʒɪk/ SYE-jik) is a Slovak GPS navigation software company based in Bratislava. Founded in 2004, it develops navigation software for smartphones, commercial vehicles and automotive applications. Sygic became the first company to offer navigation for the iPhone and the second for Android. By 2017, its navigation apps had been downloaded more than 200 million times worldwide.

In 2019, Eurowag acquired a 70% stake in Sygic, before purchasing the remaining 30% in 2024 and becoming its sole owner.

== History ==
The company was founded in 2004 by Michal Štencl, Martin Kališ, and Peter Pecho, with Michal Štencl serving as company CEO. In 2018–2024, the CEO was Martin Strigac. From January 1, 2025, Štefan Jančiga took the position of Sygic's General Manager.

In 2009, Sygic became the first company worldwide to offer GPS navigation for iPhone.

Sygic navigation app reached 100 million downloads in 2015.

In 2016, Sygic made an acquisition of Czech startup Tripomatic to expand its services to travel planning and travel management.

== Overview ==
Sygic navigation systems work on mobile phones and tablets with GPS and use screen and audio signals to provide door-to-door information for travel, live traffic & police radar/speed camera warnings, parking places, and fuel price suggestions.

Sygic navigation uses 2D & 3D maps from TomTom for both online and offline use.

Real-time traffic information is based on TomTom Traffic. Traffic information is collected from more than 400 million drivers and updated every 2 minutes. According to Sygic, "GPS data is collected from connected personal navigation devices (PNDs), commercial fleet GPS devices, mobile phone signals, road sensors, journalistic data, smartphones and car dashboard systems."

== Privacy ==
NRK (Norway's national broadcasting service) published a report about Sygic sharing data with data brokers like Gravy Analytics, part of Ventell for purposes like fraud detection, law enforcement, and national security. GDPR is setting strict limits and requirements for what companies can do with users' personal information. According to lawyers, this is in violation of the GDPR. However, neither Gravy Analytics nor Ventell are partners of Sygic, and there is no proof that the source of the data referred to was Sygic.

== See also ==
- Point of Interest
- Comparison of commercial GPS software
- Garmin
