= Géoportail =

Web mapping service of the French government

- Screenshot of geoportail.fr home page
- Website type: web mapping
- Available in: French, English, Spanish, German
- Owner: IGN
- Website: www.geoportail.gouv.fr
- Registration: no
- Launched: 23 June 2006
- Current status: active

2D view of continental France

Géoportail is a comprehensive web mapping service of the French government that publishes maps and geophysical aerial photographs from more than 90 sources for France and its territories. The service, first developed by two public agencies (the IGN and the BRGM), was officially inaugurated on 23 June 2006 by president Jacques Chirac.

Though the French service has sometimes been described as a competitor or rival to Google Maps, it is different from Google's mapping service (launched one year before in February 2005), since they have different objectives. Geoportail makes some unusual cartographic sources available, such as the renowned 18th-century Cassini maps and the Napoléonic-period Minutes État-Major, in addition to IGN road maps, administrative maps, topographic maps, cadastral and building surveys, public service utility maps, transportation maps, hydrographic maps, atmospheric and weather maps, geological maps, land use maps, maps of cultural sites, and much more. All maps and aerial photographs at Geoportail may be combined and viewed in transparent layers controlled by the user. The highest resolution of aerial photography, in general, is higher than what is available at Google Maps. Place names are identified and searchable for smallest villages and physical locations, beyond what is found on similar sites.

Since its inception in June 2006, the French service has progressively added new data and has undergone significant updates. The latest major upgrade became available in summer 2012.

== Origin of the project ==
The project originated for two main purposes:

- INSPIRE (Infrastructure for spatial information in Europe) European directive and ADELE French programme aim at the development of on-line administrative information;
- the success of other online projects like Google Maps, in which navigation in maps and satellite views is possible.

== Partners ==
- The DGME (French General Directorate for State Modernisation) is in charge of the project, with implementation managed by two state entities:

- IGN developed the visualisation interface, with the background of its own data (maps and photos),
- French Office of Geological and Mineral Research BRGM developed the catalog and search system.

- Geoconcept
- IDEE (Spain)
- SwissImage
- Swisstopo

== History of the portal ==
=== Project ===
The project was launched during summer 2005 in the IGN. The goal for the opening of the Géoportail was set as summer 2007.

On 6 January 2006, in Metz, the former President of the French Republic, Jacques Chirac, expressed the wish to open the Géoportail during the year.

In early March 2006, the IGN launched an advertising campaign about the Géoportail.

=== Launch problems ===
On 23 June 2006 the site was launched by Jacques Chirac and other ministers.

In this first release, users could browse in 2D over:

- the orthophoto (corrected aerial photographs) of France, including a great part of French overseas departments and territories, with an image resolution of 50 cm;
- the IGN maps, at a scale adapted for the chosen zoom (up to 1:25000 with a zoom of 1/3000).

After the site was first launched, connection requests were 5 times greater than expected by the project team, which led to a crash of the servers. A message was posted apologizing for this problem while a solution was found. On 1 July access to the site was restored.

== See also ==
- Google Earth
- Google Maps
- NASA World Wind
