= Yury Melnichek =

Belarusian entrepreneur, venture investor and software engineer

- Юрий Мельничек
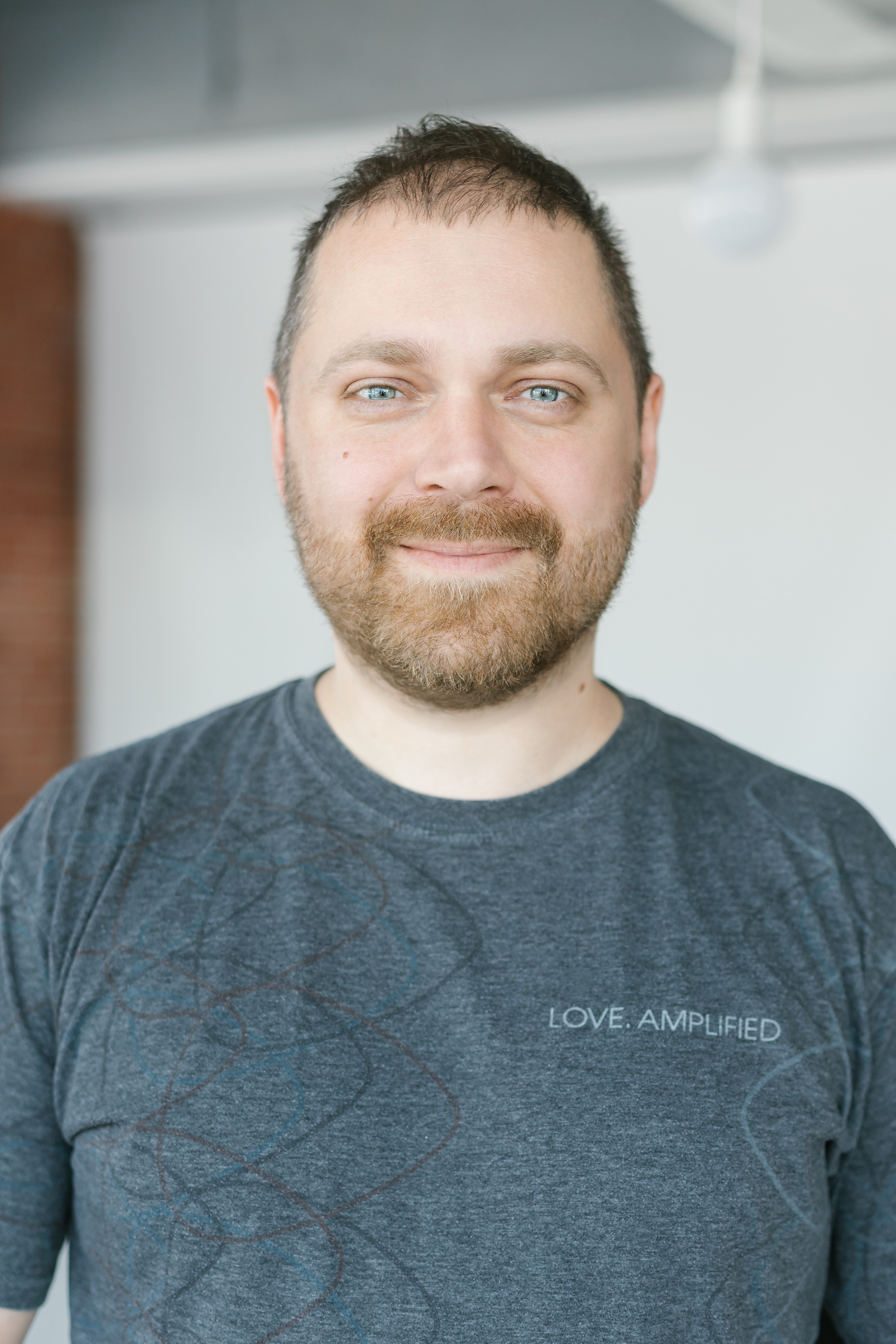
- Born: Minsk, Belorussian SSR, Soviet Union
- Education: Belarusian State University
- Occupations: Tech entrepreneur, venture investor
- Organization: Melnichek Investments
- Known for: Co-founded MapsWithMe, Vochi and Melnichek Investments
- Spouse: Anna Melnichek
- Website: melnichek.investments

Yury Melnichek (Belarusian: Юрый Мельнічак, Russian: Юрий Мельничек) is a Belarusian tech-entrepreneur, venture investor and software engineer.

He was born in Minsk, Belarus, lived in Switzerland for more than 16 years and currently lives in Cyprus. He is known for being the founder of the free cartographic service MapsWithMe, the AI platform AIMATTER, and the video editing application Vochi. In December 2021, together with Anna Melnichek, he founded the investment company Melnichek Investments to invest in promising machine learning and biotech startups.

Apart from doing investment activities, he also provides consulting services in venture investment, mobile applications marketing, and information technology companies working with machine learning, computer vision and data science. He was a long-time partner of DOBRA Foundation and Social Weekend, a social project competition, and the Open Data Science Belarus community, and has also partnered with the BelTech conference, which supports Belarusian tech founders operating globally. He also takes part in hackathons as a mentor and speaks at tech conferences.

== Early life and education ==
Yury graduated with a degree in applied mathematics and informatics from the Belarusian State University in 2005.

== Career ==
=== Maps with me ===
The company, initially called MapsWithMe, was founded in 2010. Yury launched the project together with Alexander Borsuk, Victor Govako and Sergey Retchiskiy.

MapsWithMe was first released on iOS in April 2011. In 2012, the service team won first prize at the StartupMonthly competition in Vilnius and won an internship in Silicon Valley. In February 2012, a new update of MapsWithMe was released for Android, and in July 2014, the company was renamed to MAPS.ME. MAPS.ME is a free cartographic service available on iOS, Android and Blackberry platforms.

In November 2014 MAPS.ME was acquired by Mail.ru Group, who were interested in preserving product independence within its structure and further development of MAPS.ME. MAPS.ME's acquisition garnered a lot of media attention and was featured among the most significant deals of Runet, which has stated that "thanks to this deal, the popular cartographic service is now available for free". At the moment of the deal "the app was downloaded more than 7 million times, and it was one of the most popular in the “Travel” section in more than 100 countries".

=== AIMATTER ===
In April 2016, Melnichek founded AIMATTER, a neural network-based AI platform and SDK which detects and processes images quickly on mobile devices. This was the world's first technology working on mobile devices and in streaming video. AIMATTER was used in the photo and video app Fabby, which became popular among users and was highly reviewed by experts (the app twice became No.1 in its category on ProductHunt). AIMATTER also developed hair segmentation technology during live-streaming video that was later introduced in the Fabby Look app.

In August 2017 TechCrunch announced news about Google acquiring AIMATTER. The deal became remarkable for the Belarusian IT industry, because an international publicly trading company acquired a Belarusian legal entity. Terms of the sale were not disclosed.

=== Bulba Ventures ===
In March 2018, together with his business partner Andrei Avsievich, Yury founded startup investment company Bulba Ventures. Bulba Ventures was focused on machine learning startups at the intersection of real economy & IT, life & health sciences. In February 2022, Melnichek and Avsievich announced that they were freezing joint investments within Bulba and would continue to operate separately..

=== Vochi ===
In April 2019, Bulba Ventures, as a founding investor, launched the Vochi project together with Ilya Lesun to create a “computer vision”-based video editing and effects app for smartphones. With the help of a computer vision-based video segmentation algorithm, the app let users apply effects to objects in their videos, opening up a lot of opportunities to make unique content. It was acquired by Pinterest in 2021.

=== Melnichek Investments ===
Melnichek Investments is a Cyprus-based investment company that he founded together with Anna Melnichek in December 2021. Melnichek Investments funds and supports machine learning and biotech startups. It also uses its owner's funds, sourced from previous successful startups acquisitions, to provide funding to AI startups in their pre-seed, seed, and A rounds.
