= Eurowag =

Czech company

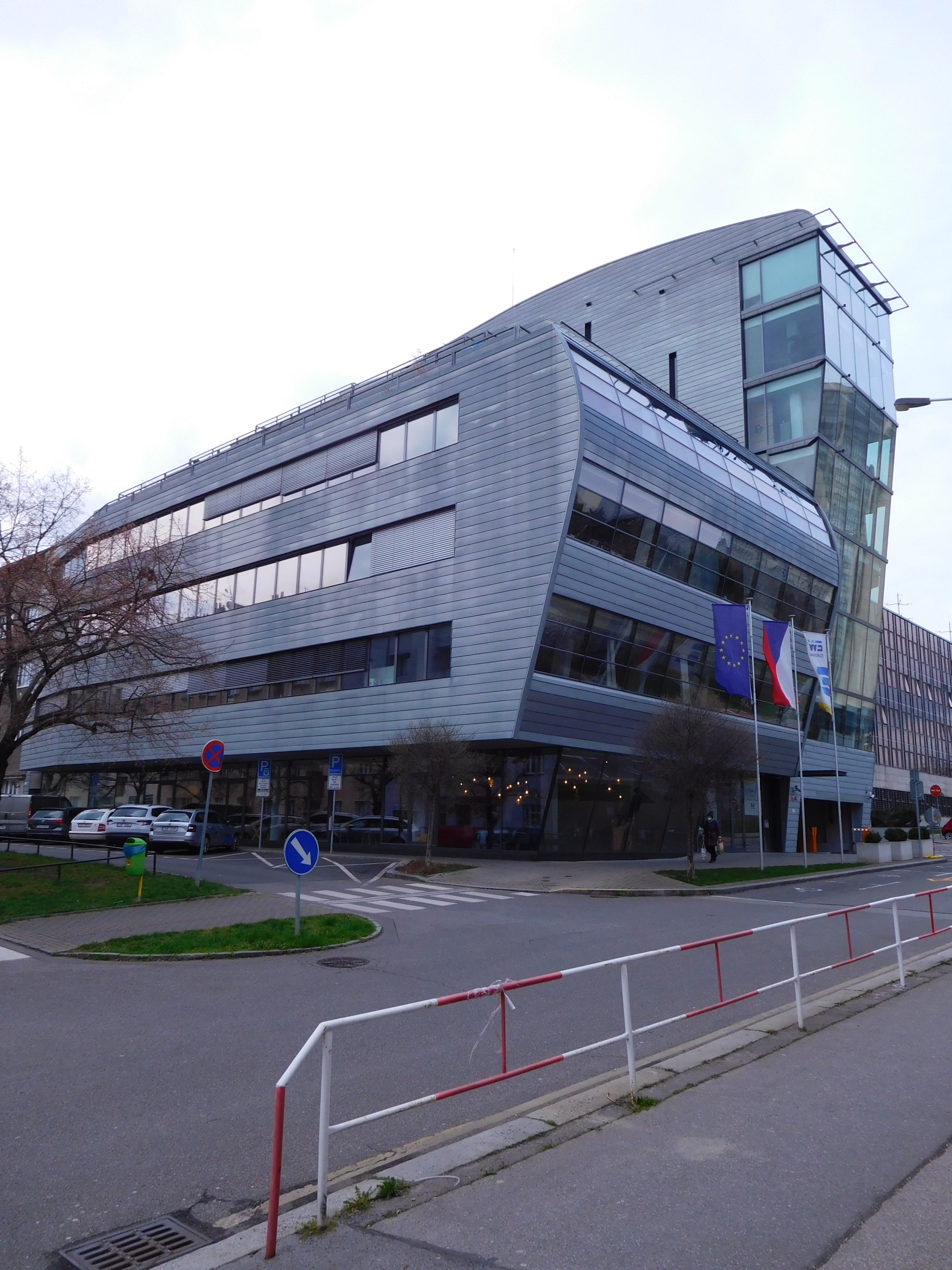
- Head Office in Prague
- Formerly: WAG Group
- Type: Public limited company
- Traded as: LSE: EWG
- Industry: Financial Services
- Founded: 1995; 31 years ago
- Founder: Martin Vohánka
- Headquarters: Prague, Czech Republic
- Key people: Steve Dryden (Chairman); Martin Vohánka (CEO)
- Products: Freight and road payments
- Revenue: ▲€2,308.3 million (2025)
- Operating income: ▲€50.2 million (2025)
- Net income: ▼€2.2 million (2025)
- Total assets: ▲€1,120.6 million (2025)
- Total equity: ▼€243.8 million (2025)
- Number of employees: 2,000 (2025)
- Website: investors.eurowag.com, www.eurowag.com

Eurowag is a Czech-founded company providing payment and mobility services to the commercial road transport industry in Europe. Its services include fuel and toll payments, fleet management, telematics and financial services.

The company was founded by Martin Vohánka in Prague in 1995 and is listed on the London Stock Exchange, where it is a constituent of the FTSE 250 Index.

== History ==
The company was founded by Martin Vohánka as a petroleum trader in the Czech Republic as the W. A. G. Group in 1995. It launched its payment services platform, which operated under the trade name of Eurowag, in 2000.

In 2016, US private-equity firm TA Associates acquired a minority stake in Eurowag. In 2017, Eurowag expanded into telematics and fleet management through the acquisition of Czech company Princip. In the same year, Eurowag was registered in the Czech Republic as a provider of the European Electronic Toll Service (EETS).

In 2019, Eurowag expanded through acquisitions, acquiring a 75% stake in Spanish and Portuguese fuel-card operator ADS and a 70% stake in Slovak navigation-software company Sygic.

As of May 2021, the company was owned 59.1% by Vohánka and 32.7% by TA Associates.

The company was listed on the London Stock Exchange (LSE) in October 2021. Its initial public offering was priced at 150 pence per share, giving the company a market capitalization of approximately £1.03 billion. Its shares fell by around 10% on their first day of trading. The flotation was described as having badly "misfired" reducing the company's valuation from the value predicted of £1.4 billion to just £0.7 billion.

In April 2022, it collaborated with a Fintech company, Factris, to offer Eurowag Cash that enables customers to factor their customer invoices.

In July 2022, Eurowag completed the acquisition of substantially all of the assets of fleet-management company WebEye. In October 2022, it agreed to acquire Polish fleet-management software provider Inelo Group for up to €306 million; the acquisition was completed in March 2023.

In September 2025, Eurowag’s LSE ticker changed from WPS to EWG.

== Operations ==
The company processes fuel and toll payments for heavy goods vehicle drivers across Europe, and offers fleet management, compliance and telematics services.

In 2025, Eurowag reported 321,500 active trucks, defined as vehicles that had paid for one of its services.
