= Locus Map =

Android navigation app

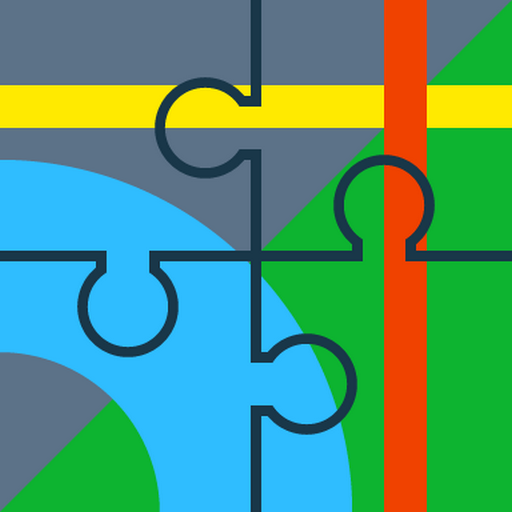

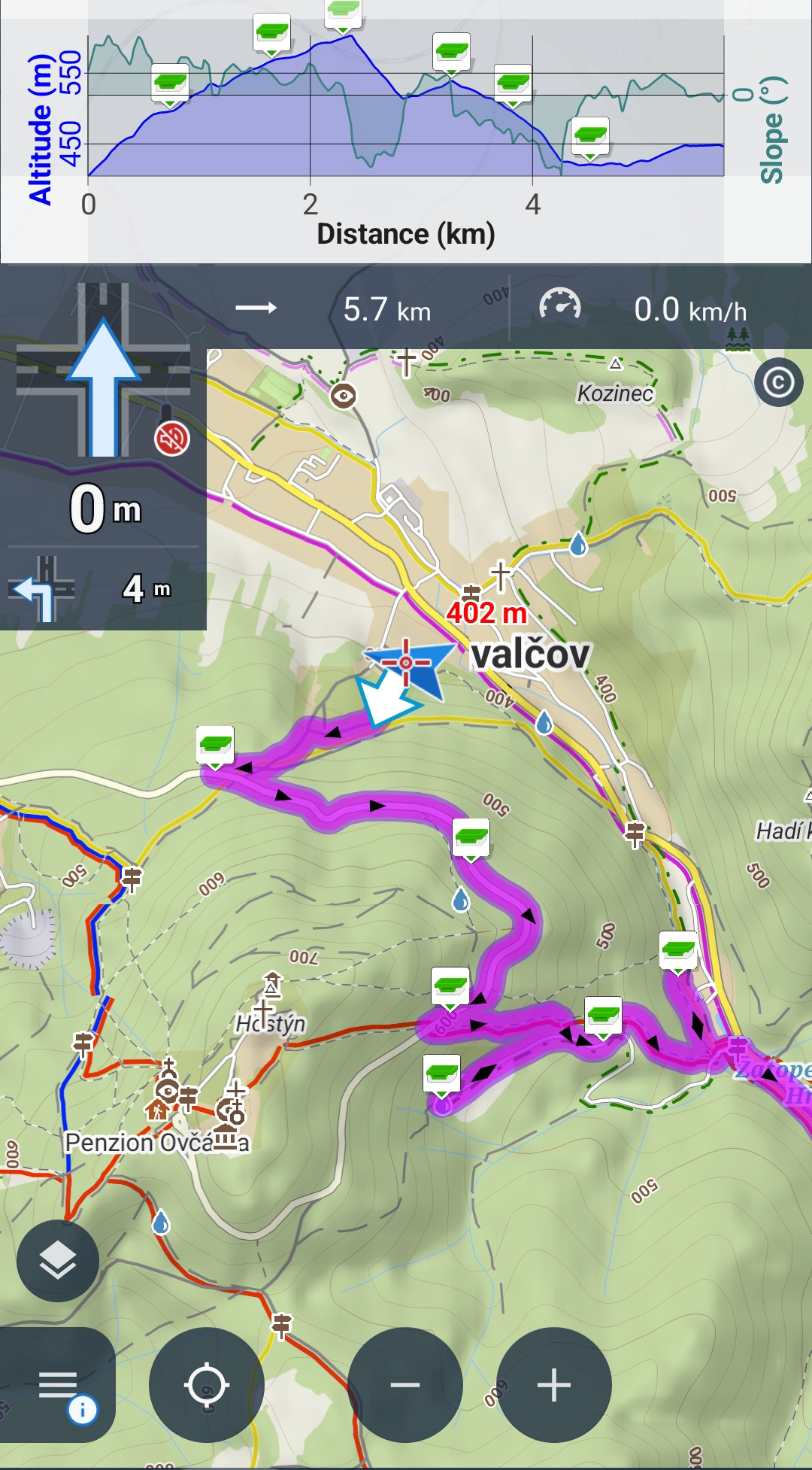
- Navigation along a geocaching route
- Developers: Asamm Software, s.r.o., Prague, CZ
- Initial release: 2010
- Operating system: Android
- Available in: English, German, French, Italian, Spanish, Chinese, and other 24 languages
- Type: Web mapping
- License: Proprietary
- Website: www.locusmap.app

Locus Map is a multi-functional outdoor navigation application, available on a subscription model for Android and iOS devices. Primarily it is designed and used for leisure time outdoor activities like hiking, biking, or geocaching. The app is also used by professionals e.g. by S&R teams or for collecting geospatial data.

The app was developed in 2010 by Czech developer Jiří Mlavec, founder of Asamm Software company, based in Prague, Czech Republic. Locus Map development is carried out in cooperation with the community of its users-contributors and as such is partially crowd-sourced.

The application has registered more than 5 000 000 installations and has been reviewed in professional media (e.g. Computer Bild. or AndroidPIT). It received awards in several app competitions and polls.

== Features ==
Track recording - creating statistics and charts, customizable recording profiles, TTS generated audio-coached workouts, support of external bluetooth and ANT+ sensors

Route planning - available either directly in the app or in the web planner

Points of interest (POI) - creating personal points, search and sorting of OSM based points of interest in an offline database, sound notifications of approaching points

Web library - cloud-based storage of users' routes, tracks and points, synchronized with all devices connected to a user's account

Search of places, addresses, coordinates (including W3W) or phone contacts

Geocaching - Locus Map is one of the official Geocaching.com API partners. It enables downloading geocaches for offline use, navigation to geocaches with map and compass, online and offline logging, supports waypoints, PocketQuery, trackables and spoilers

Turn-by-turn navigation and guidance - navigation with voice commands, beeline guidance to a point on map or by compass

Live tracking - real time sharing user's position with other users publicly or in private groups

Cycling computer functions - speedometer, odometer, average speed, maximum speed, elevation profile, elevation gain, customizable dashboard, digits are displayed above a map, support of external sensors for monitoring heart rate and pedaling cadence

Import/export - importing/exporting points and routes from/to the Internet or from/to other software in a wide range of formats (KML, KMZ, GPX...), exporting workouts to services like Strava, Runkeeper, Google Earth, etc.

GPS - skyplot displaying actual satellite network, GPS status notifications, support of external GPS units

Customization - the app offers a wide range of customization options - menus, screen panels, coordinate systems, or units

== Maps ==
Locus Map displays maps of various providers in online and offline mode:

=== Online maps ===
- World - LoMaps - OSM-based hiking/biking map and many other free maps based on OpenStreetMap
- World - Satellite maps by HERE maps and Maxar
- US - USGS, ChartBundle...
- Europe - IGN (France), Outdooractive (Germany, Austria), Kapsi.fi (Finland), Turistautak (Hungary), Skoterleder (Sweden), Map1.eu (Europe)
- other parts of the World - Visicom (Ukraine, Asia, World), GSI maps (Japan), SledMap (World), Navigasi (Indonesia), NzTopoMaps (New Zealand) and others
- support of WMS and WMTS sources - meteorological maps, NASA maps, cadastral maps...

Most of the online maps can be downloaded for offline use.

=== Offline maps ===
- World - LoMaps - OSM-based vector maps with changeable themes - hiking, cycling, skiing, road or city use
- US - AccuTerra
- UK - Ordnance Survey
- France - IGN
- Germany, Austria - Outdooractive
- other Europe - SwissTopo maps (Switzerland), SHOCart (Czech Republic and Slovakia), Compass (Poland), CNIG (Spain)
- support of SQLiteDB, TAR, MBT, GEMF, Orux or RMAP formats
- support of other OpenStreetMap data or custom map themes

== Licence ==
Locus Map is available in three versions, each with a different licensing:

- Locus Map 4 - available for Android devices - the basic version is free, has limited features and contains an advertisement banner strip. There are two more Premium plans - Silver and Gold - enabling more features, available for subscription and one-off payments. The main development branch. Available on Google Play.
- Locus Map 3 Classic - available for Android devices - originally Locus Map Pro, a single payment license with the promise of lifetime updates, no time or device limits. Its development was terminated in 2021 and the app has been in maintenance mode since then. Planned to be discontinued in 2026. Former one-time payment customers were offered a one-year subscription discount, but not moved over to a lifetime free subscription of Locus Map 4. Available on Google Play.
- Locus Map Lite - available for iOS devices - early version of the app (developed since 2023), only containing basic features like GPS location on the map, track recording and library of user data. Free in its basic version, upgradable to Premium Gold enabling satellite maps and cloud synchronization with web and other devices. Available on App Store.

== Locus community ==
Locus Map has been developed in cooperation with its users who communicate with the app's developers via dedicated forum or general GPS or navigation discussions. The main source of users' contributions is the helpdesk with voting system - users themselves vote for changes and improvements in the app. Despite the app developers operate in the Czech republic, major part of the Locus community is located in Germany. The application translations are crowd-sourced.
