= OsmAnd =

Offline maps & navigation Android and iOS app

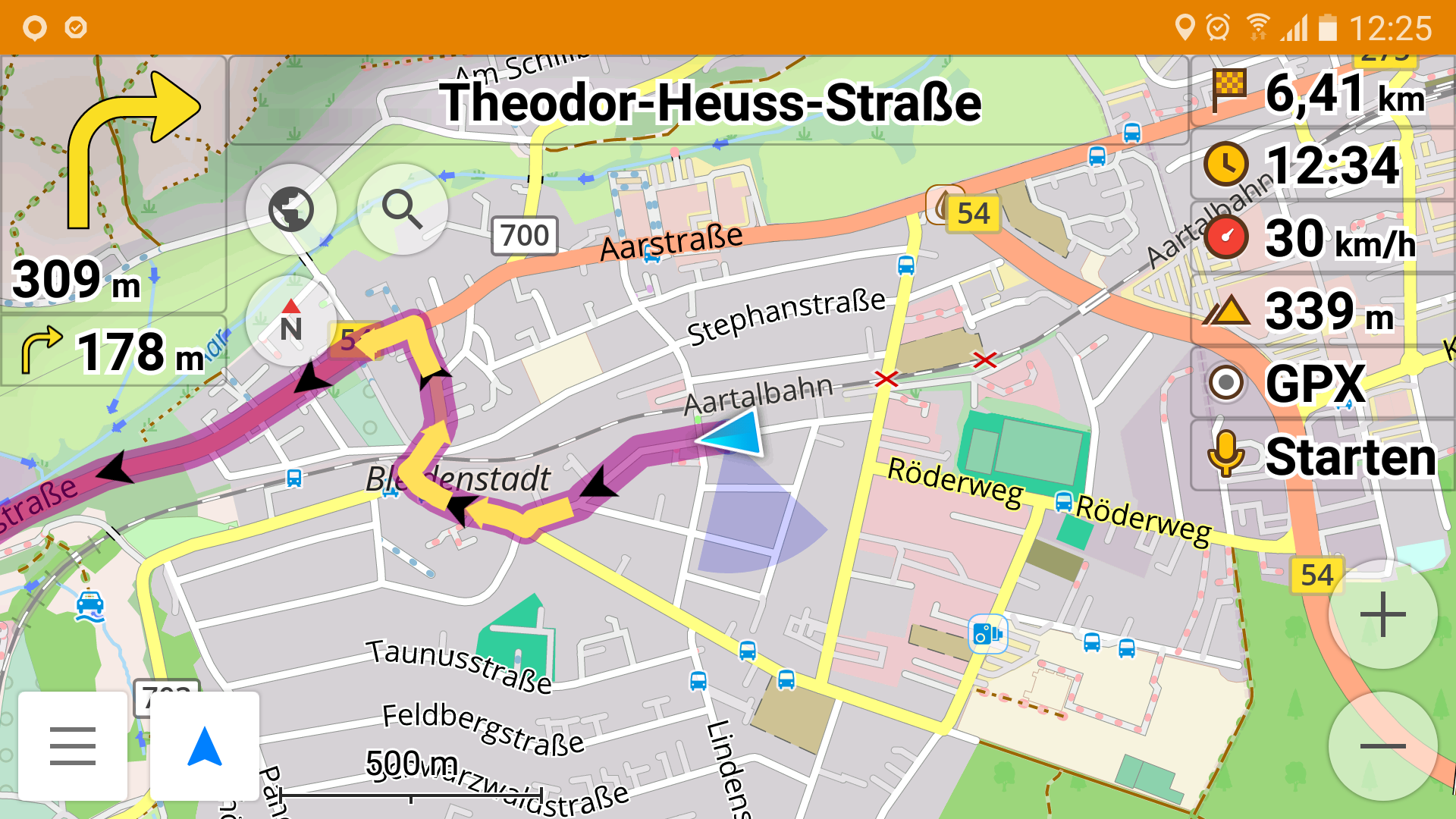
- Street routing
- Developers: Victor Shcherb, Alexey Pelykh, Hardy Mueller and others
- Release: June 1, 2010
- Stable release: Android: 5.4 (4 September 2026) iOS: 5.4 (3 September 2026)
- Written in: Java, C++
- Operating system: Android, iOS
- License: Licensing
- Website: osmand.net
- Repository: github.com/osmandapp/Osmand

OsmAnd (/ˈoʊsəmænd/; initially OpenStreetMap Android, now OpenStreetMap Automated Navigation Directions) is a free and open-source map and navigation app for Android and iOS. It uses the OpenStreetMap (OSM) map database for its primary displays, but is an independent app not endorsed by the OpenStreetMap Foundation. It is available in both free and paid versions; the latter unlocks the download limit for offline maps and provides access to Wikipedia points of interest (POIs) and their descriptions from within the app. Map data can be stored on the device for offline use. Using the device's GPS capabilities, OsmAnd offers routing, with visual and voice guidance, for car, bike, and pedestrian. All of the main functionalities work both online and offline.

== Features ==
=== Navigation ===
Navigation provides turn-by-turn voice guidance for driving, walking, biking and public transport with route calculation made on the device. Typical features like estimated time of arrival and automatic rerouting are supported.

Traffic aware routing and real-time arrival for public transport are not supported.

- Optional lane guidance, street name display, and estimated time of arrival
- Supports intermediate points

=== Maps ===
Map files are downloaded to the device by selecting which countries or regions are wanted and what data you want for that region. The files are updated monthly based on OpenStreetMap. Searching files by address, name or coordinates offline is supported.

Tile and raster maps can be viewed by enabling the Online Maps plugin. This allows viewing tiles from a server when online or viewing locally saved tiles when offline. Notably, this allows satellite views from Microsoft and Yandex to be used.

Street-level imagery can be viewed using Mapillary, Wikidata or Wikimedia Commons. The imagery is user-submitted for each source so quality and coverage will vary.

- Places can be saved as favorites
- Display POIs (points of interest)
- Optionally display place names in English, local, or phonetic spelling

=== Wikipedia Data ===
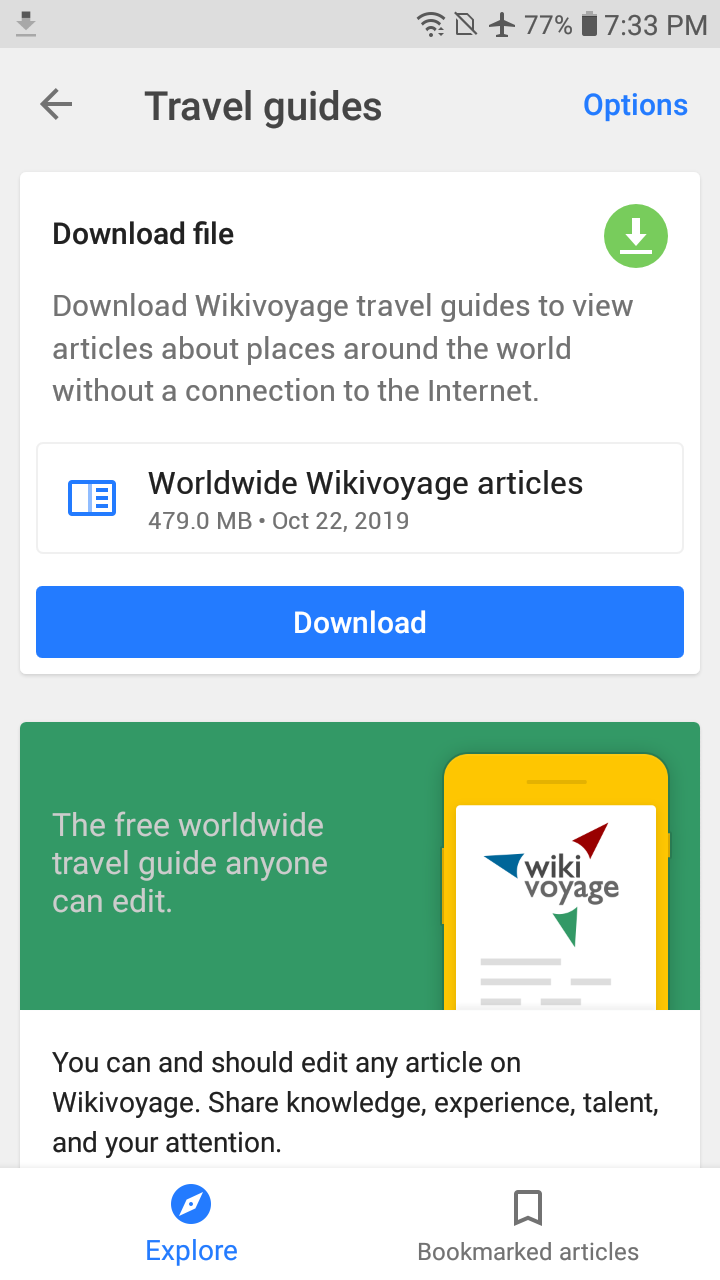
OsmAnd interface for downloading Wikivoyage articles offline

Wikipedia POIs can be downloaded and viewed offline in the app.

Wikivoyage travel guides have been supported since 2018. They can be downloaded and used offline from within the app.

=== Customization ===
OsmAnd allows customization of most things through the user interface, user-editable xml files or creating plugins. Navigation can be changed to avoid certain roads or types of roads, avoiding size and weight restricted roads and announcing traffic warnings and crosswalks. The rendering style of maps can be changed or custom maps can be created using your own data. OsmAnd publishes a standalone program called OsmAnd Map Creator that creates map files from data in the OSM format.

=== OsmAnd Plus ===
OsmAnd Plus is the paid version of the app. It unlocks unlimited maps, hillshades, slopes and more frequent updates for certain map features through OSMAnd Live.

=== Safety features ===
- Optional automated day/night view switching
- Optional speed limit display, with a reminder if the user exceeds it
- Optional speed-dependent map zooming
- Location sharing and customizable transparency

=== Bicycle and pedestrian features ===
- The maps include foot, hiking, and bike paths
- Optional trip recording to local GPX file or online service
- Optional speed and altitude display

=== Turn on screen on turn feature ===
Until version 3.2.7 OsmAnd had a feature allowing the screen to be automatically turned on, when arriving at a turn and shut down after the turn. This significantly reduced the phone's electrical consumption, allowing it to be used as a navigation tool when biking and hiking and competing with specialised GPS devices (which are still used due to their low power consumption). Google modified the Play store (not Android) guidelines to no longer allow applications to turn the screen on or off and deleted the paying application OsmAnd+ from the store on March 2, 2019. As a result, this feature was removed from the free and paying versions and OsmAnd was reinstated to the Play store. People can still download the free 3.2.7 version as an APK file, while turning off the Play Store's auto-update for this application, in order to use this feature.

=== Directly contribute to OpenStreetMap ===
The app comes with a plugin that can be enabled for OpenStreetMap contributions. This allows editing of POIs, opening Notes and uploading gpx tracks to OSM. The edits can then be stored until online and uploaded to OSM using a previously created OSM account.

== Licensing ==
OsmAnd development is on GitHub, and the source code is available under the GPLv3 license. The application is available on Google Play as a free and as a paid version (OsmAnd+) which works as a donation to the developer, unlocks the download limit for offline maps, and provides access to Wikipedia POIs and their description from within the app. A community-compiled version of the full OsmAnd+ named OsmAnd~ without Google Play services dependency is also freely available on F-Droid.

Some of the artwork, such as icons and banners, is licensed under Creative Commons Non-commercial No Derivative Works License with an exception forbidding publishing a fork to main marketplaces.

Pull requests from outside contributors – for Android and iOS – may be accepted under MIT license.

== Developer ==
OsmAnd is developed by a Dutch private limited company, OsmAnd B.V. located in Amstelveen, the Netherlands.

== Reception ==
The app has been well rated on the major mobile app stores, particularly for its offline utility. The free version of the Android app has over 184,000 reviews on Google Play with an aggregate rating of 4.4 stars. The iOS app has 4,300 reviews and an aggregate rating of 4.6 stars.

OSMAnd has been well regarded when talking about FOSS Android navigation apps. Joe Hindy from AndroidAuthority stated "It's probably not as good as something like HERE or Google Maps for online use, but it's among the best offline GPS apps available right now."

== See also ==
- Comparison of free off-line satellite navigation software
- Comparison of satellite navigation software
- Comparison of commercial GPS software
- OpenStreetMap
- Organic Maps
- CoMaps
- List of free and open-source software packages
