= NDrive =

Portuguese company

NDrive Navigation Systems SA
- Industry: GPS navigation software
- Founded: 2001
- Area served: Worldwide
- Key people: João Filipe Neto (CEO) Eduardo Carqueja (Founder) João Pedro Leite (COO) Rui Assunção (CCO)
- Products: NDrive GPS for Mobile and Automotive; NLife GPS; Karta GPS; AutoBud
- Number of employees: 50+(2018)
- Website: www.ndrive.com

NDrive is a Portuguese company of global automotive navigation systems for mobile phones and tablets. The company was founded in 2001 and is headquartered in Porto, Portugal. It became one of the first companies to offer navigation for Android and iPhone and the first GPS navigation for Bada and WebOS.

== History ==
The company was founded in 2001 by Eduardo Carqueja.

== See also ==
- Point of Interest
- Comparison of commercial GPS software
- Garmin
