= Gravy Analytics =

Data broker company

Gravy Analytics, Inc.
- Industry: Data broker
- Founded: April 2011
- Headquarters: Ashburn, Virginia
- Key people: Jeff White (CEO)
- Parent: Unacast, Inc.
- Subsidiaries: Venntel, Inc.
- Website: gravyanalytics.com

Gravy Analytics is an American data broker company specializing in the collection and sale of location data collected from mobile devices. In November 2023, Gravy Analytics merged with Unacast, a company that provides location insights.

Venntel, a U.S. government contractor, is a subsidiary of Gravy Analytics. In 2022, a Freedom of Information Act lawsuit by the American Civil Liberties Union showed that Venntel sold user location data to several government agencies including the Department of Homeland Security, Immigration and Customs Enforcement, and Customs and Border Protection.

In December 2024, the Federal Trade Commission filed a complaint against Gravy Analytics and Venntel for knowingly collecting and selling user location data without consent, including for sensitive locations relating to medical conditions, religious affiliation, and political activities.

Leaked data from Gravy Analytics was posted on the Russian cybercrime forum XSS in early January 2025. The leak contained millions of location coordinates and the names of thousands of mobile applications, thus confirming that Gravy Analytics was utilizing real-time bidding to source location data through advertisers, rather than location-gathering code intentionally embedded in apps by their developers.
