= Maps.me =

Commercial satellite navigation software using OpenStreetMap data

- Original authors: Yury Melnichek, Alexander Borsuk, Viktor Govako, Siarhei Rachytski
- Developers: MapsWithMe GmbH, My.com
- Release: 2011
- Stable release: 12.0.1 / January 15, 2021; 5 years ago
- Written in: C++, Objective-C, Java
- Operating system: Android, iOS, BlackBerry
- Size: 232 MB Android / 302.5 MB iOS
- License: Proprietary
- Website: maps.me

Maps.me is a mobile app for Android, iOS and BlackBerry that provides offline maps using OpenStreetMap data. It was formerly known as MapsWithMe. In November 2014, it was acquired by Mail.Ru Group and became part of its My.com brand. In September 2015, the app was open sourced and a free and open-source software version was additionally made available on F-droid until the application was sold to the payment processor Daegu Limited, part of Parity.com, which changed the application user interface and content, leading original MapsWithMe founders Alexander Borsuk and Viktor Govako to release an open source ad- and tracker-free fork called 'Organic Maps' in response.

== History ==
Maps.me was founded by Yury Melnichek, Alexander Borsuk, Viktor Govako and Siarhei Rachytski. Under the leadership of Alexander, MapsWithMe onboarded 2.5M users worldwide.

In November 2014, it was acquired by Mail.Ru Group and became part of its My.com brand. In September 2015, the app was open sourced and a free and open-source software version was additionally made available on F-droid.

In November 2020 Mail.ru Group sold Maps.me to the payment processor Daegu Limited, part of Parity.com Group. Daegu Limited changed the application user interface and content. Following this acquisition in January 2021, a fork — Organic Maps — was created by Alexander, Roman and Viktor, and is developed by the FOSS community.

After governance concerns in Organic Maps, the CoMaps project was created in June 2025 by former Organic Maps contributors.

=== MapsWithMe GmbH ===
The application was formerly known as MapsWithMe and initially developed by Zurich-based MapsWithMe GmbH with a development office in Minsk.

In 2012, MapsWithMe came in first in the Startup Monthly competition in Vilnius. The team won a nine-week traineeship in Silicon Valley as a prize.

=== Mail.ru Group ===
In November 2014, Maps.me was acquired by Mail.Ru Group for 542 million Russian rubles (around US$14 million at that time) to be integrated with My.com, and the app was made free of charge. The engineering team was relocated to the Mail.Ru Group office in Moscow to continue working on the project.

In 2019, its revenue amounted to 159 million rubles (US$2.5 million) with an EBITDA loss of 25 million rubles (US$0.39 million).

=== Daegu Ltd and partners ===
On November 2, 2020, Daegu Limited bought Maps.me for 1.56 billion Russian rubles (approximately US$20 million at that time). Daegu Limited is announced to be part of Parity.com Group.

On September 18, 2022, Maps.me announced the launch of a mobile app wallet with a prepaid Mastercard in partnership with Monavate.

== See also ==
- List of online map services
- Comparison of commercial GPS software
