= Institut national de l'information géographique et forestière =

French agency that produces and maintains geographical information

Current logo of Institut national de l’information géographique et forestière

The Institut national de l'information géographique et forestière (French pronunciation: [ɛ̃stity nɑsjɔnal də lɛ̃fɔʁmasjɔ̃ ʒeɔɡʁafik e fɔʁɛstjɛʁ]; "National Institute of Geographic and Forest Information"), previously Institut géographique national (French pronunciation: [ɛ̃stity ʒeɔɡʁafik nɑsjɔnal]; "National Geographic Institute") and still abbreviated as IGN, is a French public state administrative establishment founded in 1940 to produce and maintain geographical information for France and its overseas departments and territories.

== Administrative organisation ==
The IGN depends on the French Ministry of Equipment, Transport, Town and Country Planning, Tourism and Sea. Its missions are fixed by decrees.

State subsidies represent 51% of the budget, and sales 49%.

The IGN runs four laboratories to research geographical information acquisition, production, distribution and applications. It also runs its own school to teach techniques to its staff and other students: École nationale des sciences géographiques (English: National School of Geographical Sciences) or ENSG.

== Missions ==
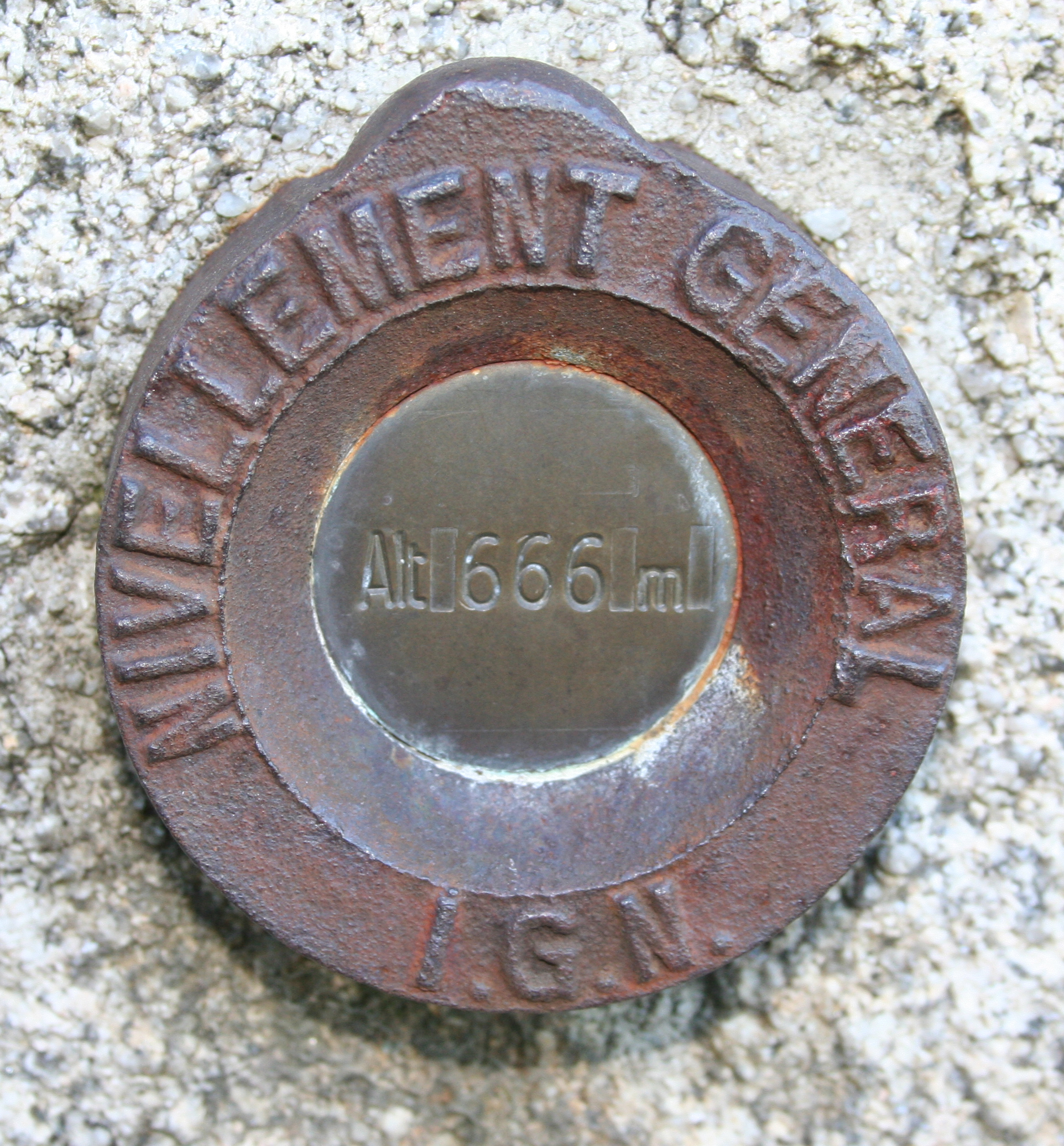
IGN benchmark at Saint Goussaud, Limousin, France, by Institut Geographique National

The IGN is responsible for the management and updating of:

- geodetic and levelling networks,
- aerial photographs,
- geographical databases and maps.

It has to lead research, and to take part in the standardization process in the field of geographical information. It has to manage ENSG, and the documentation service about its products, techniques and services.

A group of French public administrations, in partnership with the IGN, establish the Large Scale Reference (Référentiel à grande échelle, RGE): orthophoto, topography, cadastral survey and address databases which can be superimposed on all the French territory, with a 1-meter resolution.

== Products ==
Covering the whole French territory:

- topographic maps on the 1:25,000, 1:50,000 and 1:100,000 scales
- road maps on the 1:250,000 and 1:1,000,000 scales (this last one covers metropolitan France on one sheet).
- maps of foreign countries
- ICAO aeronautical maps on the 1:500,000 scale for visual flying (VFR).

The IGN is also in charge of the Géoportail. The associated shop Le Monde des Cartes at 50 Rue de la Verrerie in Paris closed in 2017.

== History ==
The IGN is the successor to the Geographical Service of the Army (Service Géographique de L’Armée or SGA), which was founded in 1887 and disbanded in 1940, itself a successor to the Dépôt de la Guerre. The old maps produced by the SGA were divided into two batches: one which remained at the Institute and one which joined the military files of Vincennes. The general Louis Hurault, who was at the origin of these modifications, was the first director of the IGN. He tried, in vain, to recover the material shared by the Germans. A law in ten articles is signed the 14 in order to define the functions of the IGN. The statutes had been signed the 8. This established the national School of geographical sciences in order to train Cartographical engineers.

During the Second World War, the IGN became famous for its counterfeiters. The cartographers are indeed experts in penmanship and the material necessary to the production of fake identity papers was available to the institute. Certain engineers of the IGN were in contact with the services of allied information based in London. In secret, they brought a complete set of maps to London covering France and North Africa in order to replace maps destroyed in a bombardment.

The agents of the IGN took an active part in armed resistance in 1943. Several agents were shot by the Germans or died in action. Between September 1944 and on 8 May 1945, the IGN was under the control of the "provisional government" and most of its personnel and of his services are transformed into "military geographical Service". At the end of the war, the IGN received the thanks of Generals Bradley and Eisenhower.

Between 1945 and 1946, the debate is intense concerning the future of the IGN, last creation of the Third Republic. A law is finally signed the 8. It confirms the membership of the IGN to the Ministry of works and create the "geographical Section of staff of the Army", new section in charge of the military map.

In 1947, the IGN receives the mission of covering the whole France, but also all the dependents' territories, like North Africa, Western Africa, Madagascar, the countries associated with Indochina and the departments and overseas territories. The task is considerable with more than 12 million km ² being covered. The independence of these countries will have as a consequence the creation of national services in each country (examples: DTGC in Senegal, IGN-N in Niger).

To carry out the aerial survey task, the IGN was equipped in 1948 with several ex USAAF Boeing B-17 Flying Fortresses, specially modified for the task. They were based at Creil airfield to the north of Paris. The aircraft were replaced by French-built Hurel-Dubois HD.34 twin engined survey aircraft in the late 1950s.

The IGN then initiates a period of active co-operation with the majority of these organizations by providing some engineers of the IGN and also receive the students of the ENSG who intended to become the executives of the cartographic services of new independent countries. The activity of the IGN apart from the French territory also develops by the control geodesic project(Ecuador 1975, Libya 1979, Saudi Arabia 1981), of cartography (Saudi Arabia, Burundi, Senegal, Mali, Ivory Coast, Togo, Benin...).

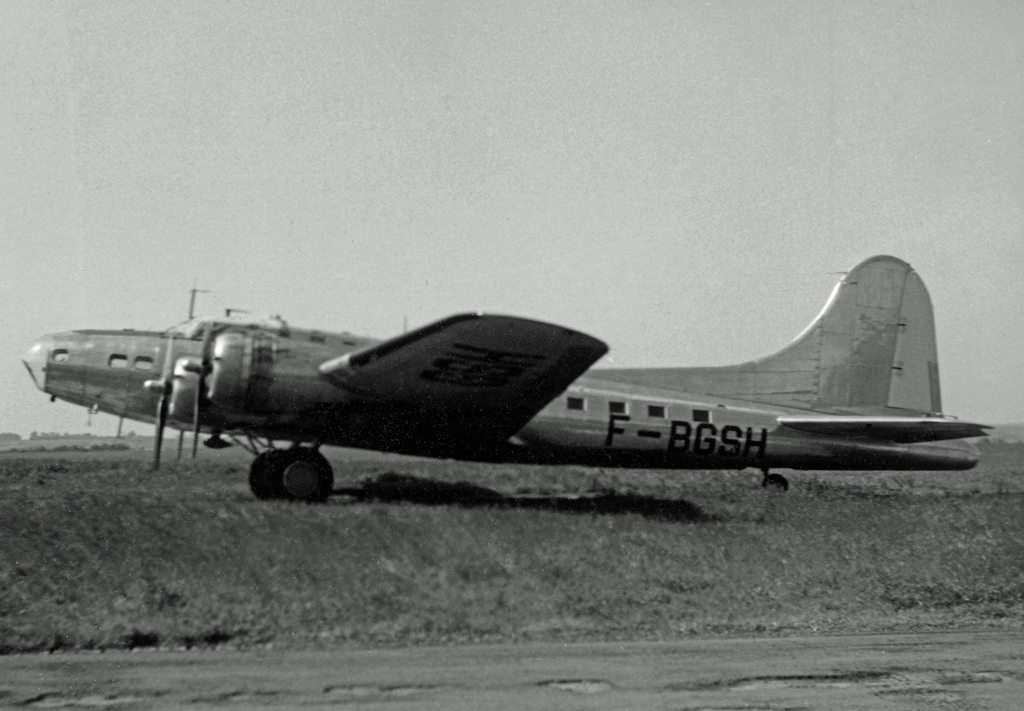
Boeing B-17 survey aircraft of the IGN at Creil airfield in 1957

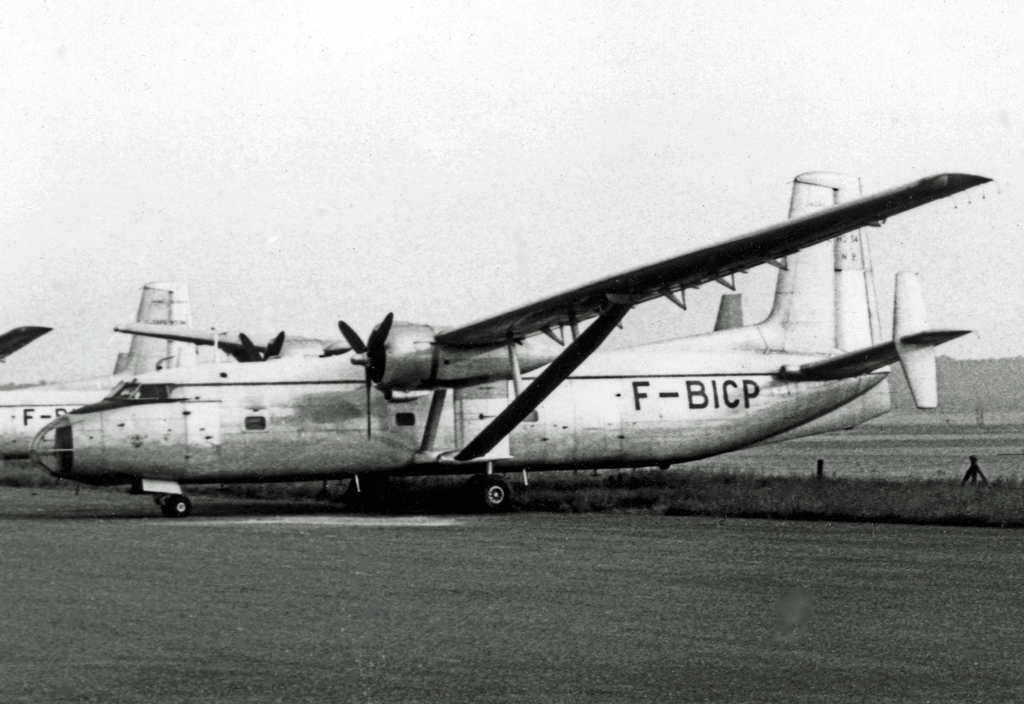
Hurel-Dubois HD.34 survey aircraft of the IGN at Creil in 1967

1982 to 1988, the control of a large topometric project and numerical cartography in Riyadh is the occasion to massively introduce digital techniques into the processing production; in parallel, the idea of a topoland data base emerges at meetings of the "national Commission of the geographical information" chaired by Guy Lengagne; this commission returns his report in 1983 and outlines numerical geographical information then in agreement with the period of the basic map with 1:25 000.Publicly owned establishment related to administration since 1 January 1967, it is placed under the supervision of the ministry for Transport, the equipment, tourism and the sea.

In 1971, the IGN and the CNES form the "Group of research of geodesic space". This collaboration between the IGN and the CNES continues with the launching of the program SPOT the 5. The launching of satellite SPOT-1 takes place the 22.Six days after take SPOT-1 in orbit, the IGN create its programme of "data bases launches", the "data bases". The data base of the cities, the data base of leveling distribution, the data base of geodesic distribution, the aerial missions data base and the toponyms data base were progressively established . The "Topo data base", bases of topographic data digitized, covers from now on the whole of France and includes nearly two million toponyms.

Its activities abroad begin into 1986 within a new subsidiary private company IGN France International.

From 2000, the IGN develops the concept of Reference frame on a Large Scale (référentiel à grande échelle = RGE); it is a question of completing within a deadline short digitalization the cartography of the French territory with a meter scale and according to four components: topography, land registry and address. This RGE is entirely completed at the end of 2008. Then it enter in a cycle of maintenance in June 2006, the IGN opened the service Géoportail allowing the cartographic visualization of the French territory on a Web navigator and using on one hand funds of air photographs and on the other hand the digitized maps to the 1/25 000. "Phase 2" of Géoportail was put on line one year later, with a new ergonomics.

At the end of 2006, the IGN was involved in the production of a receiver GPS, for the excursion and automobile navigation, called Evadeo. The software of navigation was provided by BCI navigation (replaced in 2008 by CompeGPS), the road data are of Navteq and it puce GPS of SiRF, and the IGN provides a part with extracts of its maps at various scales.

In June 2007, the IGN started offering a service whereby it is possible to have a map printed centred on any location in France. This is similar to the service offered in Great Britain by the Ordnance Survey.

In July 2007, Géoportail – an online map service – began offering 3D movable views in a similar style to GoogleEarth. To use this function, it is necessary to install the plugin TerraExplorer.

From 1 January 2012, the Institut Géographique National merged with the Inventaire forestier national to form the Institut national de l’information géographique et forestière, keeping the same IGN acronym.

== See also ==
- IGN FI, private subsidiary of IGN
- MicMac (software)
