= Magic Earth Inc. =

Oil and gas software company

- Industry: Gas and oil
- Founded: 1999; 27 years ago in Houston, USA
- Fate: Acquired by Halliburton
- Products: SpecDecompInteractive
- Owner: Halliburton

Magic Earth Inc. was a company founded in 1999 in Houston, Texas that was acquired by Halliburton in 2001. After the acquisition, the subsidiary was responsible for virtualization software for the gas and oil drilling industry.

== Overview ==
In 2001, Halliburton paid $100 million as a stock-for-stock transaction for the acquisition of Magic Earth as a subsidiary, by then headquartered in Houston, Texas. At the time Magic Earth specialized in oil and gas well exploration technology, volume visualization and interpretation solutions developing software called GeoProbe. With the acquisition, Halliburton aimed to combine Magic Earth's software with the data infrastructure of another subsidiary, Landmark Software Solutions.

As of April 2001, Texaco was reported to have a 25% share in Magic Earth.

In 2002 as a subsidiary of Halliburton, Magic Earth released SpecDecompInteractive, a tool for reservoir imaging and interpretation, based on spectral decomposition algorithms developed by BP. It aids the qualitative analysis of reservoir boundaries, heterogeneities, and thicknesses.

Magic Earth filed a patent in geo-spatial analysis in 2000 (published in 2006) for a system and method to track a physical phenomena represented within a 3D space.

The Kidra visualization center in Stavanger, Norway utilized Magic Earth software that enabled experts to provide work processes for clients in the oil industry. Petrodata, the manager of Petrobank, Norway's oil and gas geological database utilized Magic Earth's Geoprobe tools.

The Magic Earth website started redirecting to the main Landmark Graphics Solution home page sometime in December 2004 until 2006. The domain was then taken over by unrelated navigation software, also named Magic Earth.
