= Organic Maps =

Offline map and navigation app for Android & iOS

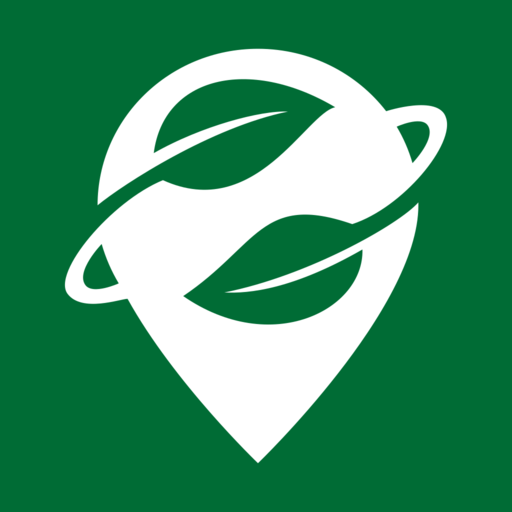

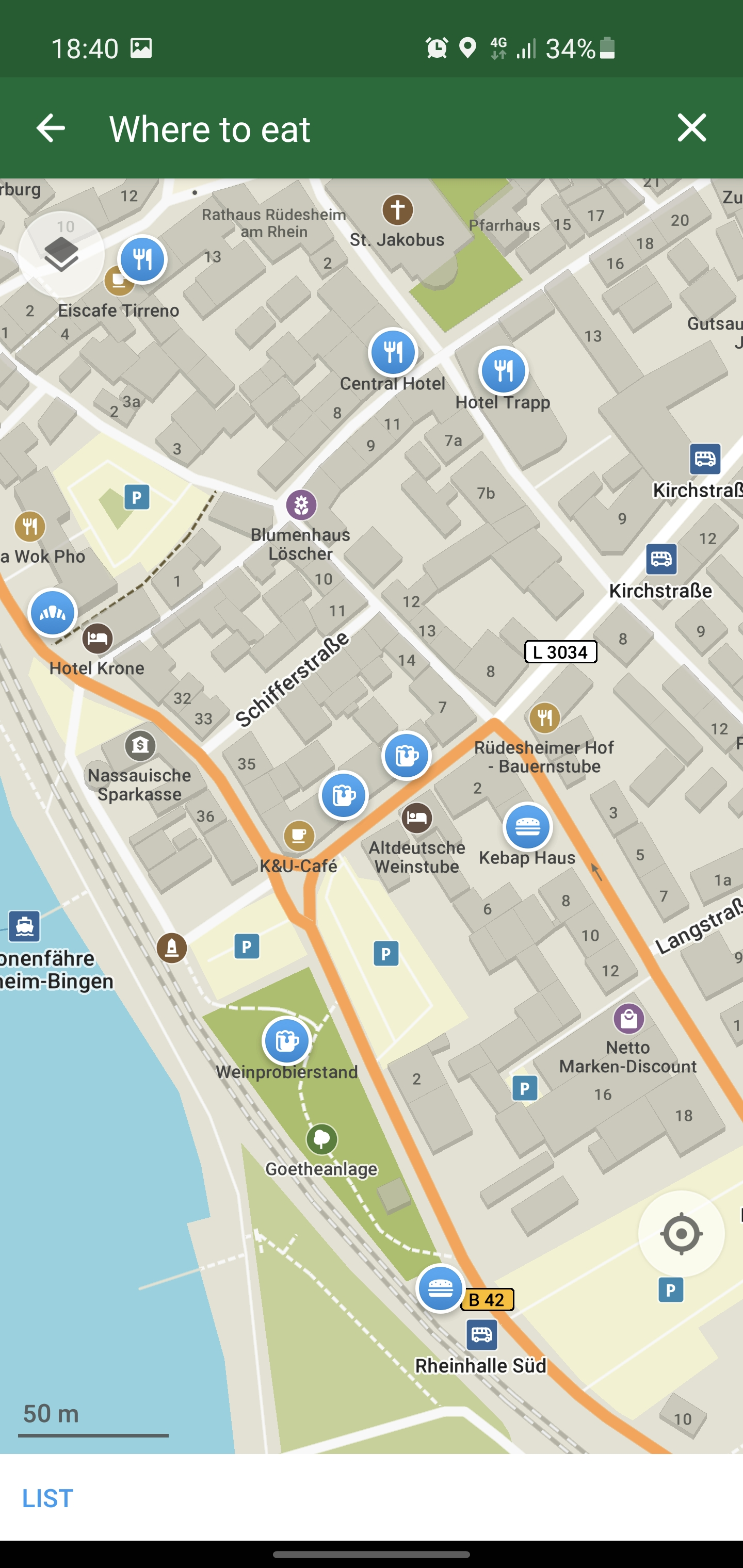
- Developer: Organic Maps OÜ
- Release: 2021
Stable release
- Android: 2026.09.29-32-android / 29 September 2026
- iOS: 2025.08.19 / 19 August 2025
- Written in: C++ (Core), Java (Android), Objective-C, Swift (iOS)
- Operating system: Android, iOS, macOS, Linux
- Predecessor: Maps.me
- License: Apache License 2.0 (app), Proprietary (map data files)
- Website: organicmaps.app
- Repository: github.com/organicmaps/organicmaps

Organic Maps is an offline navigation app that uses map data from OpenStreetMap. The application is designed to function without internet connectivity by downloading maps for offline use and does not track user locations or collect personal data.

== Features ==
=== Privacy ===
Organic Maps does not collect personal data or track user locations.

=== Offline maps ===
Organic Maps allows users to download map data for offline navigation, search, and route planning. The downloadable maps include information such as cycling routes, hiking trails, and elevation details.

=== Reduced battery consumption ===
Organic Maps saves cell phone battery life.

=== Navigation ===
Organic Maps supports turn-by-turn navigation with voice guidance for driving, biking, and walking. Users can search the map and save locations as bookmarks.

=== Wikipedia articles ===
Organic Maps allows users to read Wikipedia articles for popular places.

== OpenStreetMap data ==
Organic Maps uses data from the OpenStreetMap project and includes an offline editor that allows users to contribute updates, such as business or landmark information.

== History ==
Organic Maps was founded as a fork of Maps.me app in December 2020.

The app Maps.me was initially launched in 2011 as MapsWithMe, later renamed Maps.me and open-sourced in 2015. On 20 December 2020, the then-owner of Maps.me app released a new version that was not based on the code published on GitHub, which resulted in backlash from the community. One of the users published a call to fork Maps.me and rebuild the community around it, and on 27 December a hackathon was organised to bootstrap the new project based on a previous fork that was used to publish the app on F-Droid. Two of the Maps.me app authors, Alexander Borsuk and Viktar Havaka, started their own fork on 20 December 2020, registered organicmaps.app domain on the next day and joined efforts with the community fork in January 2021. The project adopted guidelines and development policies and early documentation stated goals related to privacy, performance, and community governance. The first public release of Organic Maps was made available in the app stores in June 2021.

In April 2025, members of the Organic Maps community raised concerns regarding project governance and transparency. These issues were outlined in an open letter addressed to the project's shareholders. The lack of a satisfactory resolution between the shareholders and the community contributors led a group of contributors to establish a separate, independent project known as CoMaps.

In August 2025 the developers changed the license for their map data binaries, allowing use in other applications only with prominent attribution to the OpenStreetMap and Organic Maps projects.

== See also ==
- Comparison of free off-line satellite navigation software
- List of free and open-source software packages
- Comparison of satellite navigation software
- Google maps
- OpenStreetMap
- Privacy enhancing technology
- Surveillance
