= IGN FI =

IGN France International
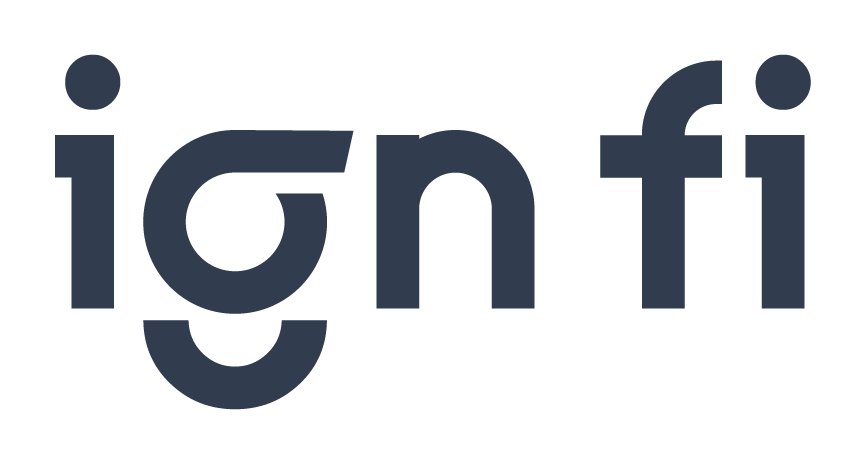
- Type: Public limited company
- Industry: Geographic information consultancy
- Headquarters: Paris, France
- Key people: Christophe Dekeyne, General Manager
- Number of employees: 44
- Website: www.ignfi.com

Created in 1986, IGN FI is the private subsidiary of the French Institut Géographique National (IGN) and works essentially abroad. Its goal is to promote the savoir-faire of the French IGN around the world.

A company specializing in geographic information, IGN FI intervenes in numerous fields, both in its core business of cartography as well as in the fields of environment, agriculture, urban planning, civil security and land management.

IGN FI is involved in all levels of project preparation:

- Geodesy - metrology - cartography - databases acquisition: aerial photography, satellite images, field surveys, and geodetic networks
- Data processing: Orthophotographs, DTM (digital terrain models), DEM (digital elevation models), photogrammetric restitution, and 3D models
- Modelling: structuring of information depending on the intended applications
- Installation of geographic information systems (GIS) and thematic portals

IGN FI also offers project management assistance, project management, technical assistance, training or complete or partial technology and knowledge transfers.

== History ==
IGN FI is the subsidiary of the National Institute of Geographic and Forest Information (IGN) and is involved in geographic information engineering. Created in 1986, its services are mainly offered to foreign decision-makers such as technical ministries and communities. The company works alone or within a consortium, depending on the circumstances.

Its core business - NSDI, geodesy, metrology, cartography, databases, GIS and web portals – targets the following fields: land administration (cadastre, land assessment), environment, agriculture, security, and energy.

Its shareholders are made up of IGN, GEOFIT Group, GEOFIT Expert, Esri (llc and France), Imao and Altereo.

== Relationship with the French IGN ==
IGN FI benefits from a privileged relationship with its mother company, the French IGN. This exists in the form of the provision of technical experts (cartographers, geodetic experts, topographers) or training sessions provided by the ENSG, the Institute's geomatics school. IGN France International also benefits from the research undertaken within the French IGN's four laboratories: the LAREG (Laboratory of Research in Geodesy), the LOEMI (Optical and Micro-computer Laboratory), the MATIS (Methods of Analysis and Image Processing for Stereo-restitution) and the COGIT (Object Conception and Generalization of Topographic Information). The close collaboration with IGN Espace, specialist in the processing and use of satellite images, allows the company to propose quality spatial imagery services to its foreign clients.

== IGN FI's structure ==
IGN FI is based in Paris and is made up of around 44 employees. Local branches are also set up punctually to accompany the projects that it leads abroad.

Christophe Dekeyne has been the General Manager since 2007. The general management department is reinforced by a commercial and sales department, led by Christophe Dekeyne, a technical department led by Aurélie Milledrogues and a financial department.

In addition to the technical skills that it possesses internally, IGN FI can also count on the French IGN experts that are often called upon for its projects, as well as its network of institutional or private partners.

== Intervention methods ==
IGN FI's development strategy is oriented towards the facilitation of project implementation. The company also favours the transfer of skills.

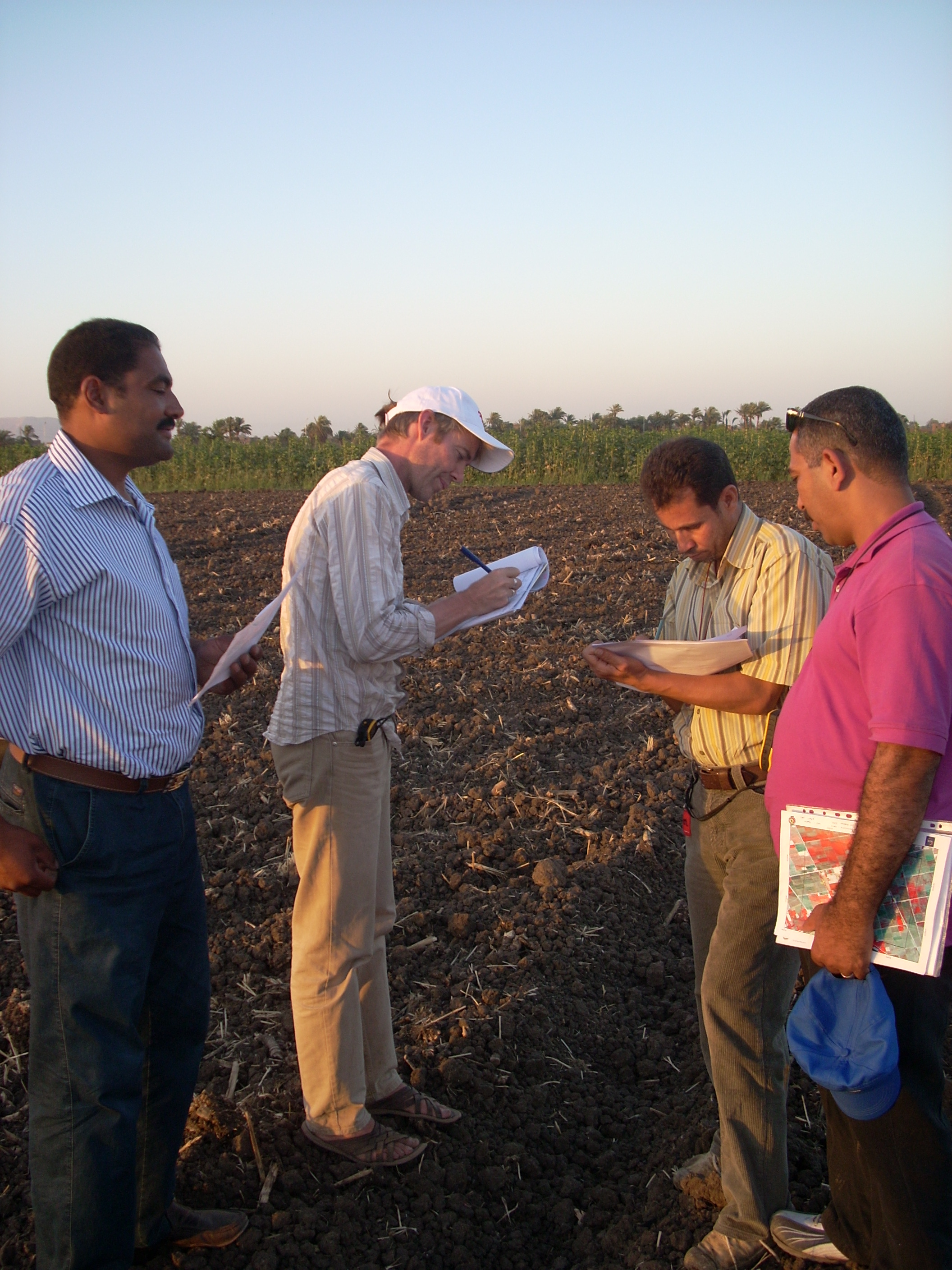
Field survey in the Nile Valley

IGN FI most often takes the role of project manager, but also provides project management assistance. Project management assistance consists of providing complete services and is made up of several phases such as the definition of global processes, the drafting of a quality plan, the drafting or assisting the draft of call for bids, the scoring and analysis of the proposals as well as the periodic provision of experts for critical project phases.

The projects that are undertaken by IGN France International are often accompanied by, when necessary, important practical training sessions, provided in the given country or in France.

== Areas of intervention and clients ==
IGN FI offers its services to the following professionals:

- National mapping agencies
- Foreign technical ministries (environment, energy, natural resources, urban planning)
- Foreign municipalities
- Large French or foreign groups that are active abroad
- French or foreign consultancy firms that are active abroad.

The company works around the world with projects in countries including Panama, Uganda, Qatar, Gabon, Saint-Dominguez, Brazil, Luxembourg, The United Kingdom, Egypt, Libya, Tunisia, Algeria, Morocco, Senegal, Burkina Faso, Namibia, Yemen, Saudi Arabia, the United Arab Emirates, Sri Lanka, Russia, Uzbekistan, Thailand, Vietnam, Indonesia, and China. IGN FI is present in more than 120 countries.

Historically very involved in Africa, the company completed projects such as:

- The mapping of flooded and flood-prone areas in Senegal
- The urban cartography of the seven main cities in Senegal
- The modernization of Senegal's cartography at a scale of 1:200,000
- A land information system (LIS) in Uganda
- The supervision of the updating of geodetic networks (Cameroun)
- An agricultural inventory in Egypt (a technical symposium was held at the end of 2010 in Egypt and focused on the added value of geographic information for agricultural projects).

The company is also very active in the Middle East and Asia:

- Opening an IGN FI branch in Abu Dhabi
- Demarcation of the land border and delimitation of offshore border lines between the Kingdom of Saudi Arabia and the State of Qatar

IGN FI also has a strong presence in Europe:

- The Corine Land Cover project in Europe, which was composed of environmental databases in 38 European countries, and whose methodology is currently being adapted to the Andean countries
- The production of a database and digital cartography for the Grand Duchy of Luxembourg
- The establishment of a spatial data infrastructure in Serbia
- The implementation of an environmental GIS in Romania.

== Sectors of application ==
IGN FI is active in the field of geomatics and offers its services in several areas: data acquisition, data processing and data modeling, creation of GIS and specific databases, the elaboration, installation and integration of web and thematic portals and the management and use of spatial data. It is involved in the creation and implementation of projects involving monitoring, piloting and assistance in their completion.

It offers support to its clients in the realization of their cartography projects, including both the initial constitution and updates, and more particularly the transfer of technology phase aimed at their local teams.

It also participates in data acquisition, aerial photography, satellite image acquisition, field surveys and the constitution of geodetic systems.

It also participates in the production of orthophotos and digital terrain or elevation models (DTM, DEM), photogrammetric restitution, the creation of 3D models and navigable databases and all databases necessary to the creation of maps.

IGN FI development and installation of dedicated information systems like GIS (geographic information systems) and LIS (land information systems). It also performs development and installation for web applications like geoportals and thematic portals.

=== Cartography ===
Valuable tools for understanding territories, the concept of the map has greatly diversified taking the form of vector or raster geographic databases. The map's utility to the general public has also exploded.

At a national level, a country's cartography is more often associated with a spatial data infrastructure (NSDI). This process completely redefines the production and distribution of cartographic data, which become independent and complementary layers of information.

IGN FI offers support in clients' cartographic projects, from the initial constitution all the way through updates, in particular in the phase where technology is transferred to their teams.

Examples:

- Mapping of Senegal at a scale of 1:200,000
- NSDI in Serbia

=== Geodesy and metrology ===
Different GNSS systems are used today to achieve accuracy within a few millimeters. Thanks to these systems, the field of geodesy has encountered a revolution and provides cartographers and developers with points of reference, growing more accurate with each passing day.

Reduced to a more local scale, metrology allows, through sub-millimetric details, the monitoring of the temporal evolution of structures or also the provision of assistance for the implementation of nuclear fusion experiments.

Strengthened by the internationally recognized scientific and practical experience of the French National Geographic Institute's (IGN) Geodesy Department, IGN FI offers services in the fields of geodesy and metrology, such as mapping the border between the Kingdom of Saudi Arabia and the State of Qatar

=== Land administration ===
Land administration projects make up a major concern in numerous countries, given what they represent and what is at stake. Major donors are often mobilized because these projects aim to bring stability, new developments in land markets and transparency of land values to the system.

Geographic information is an essential component of land administration through the collection and updating of cadastral data and through the development of information systems that allow the management of land activity.

IGN FI offers project management assistance in all technical and legal fields to actual project completion, implementation and monitoring. It also has a privileged relationship with the French organization for public financing (DGFiP).

Examples:

- Land information system in Uganda
- A CAMA-type application in Namibia

=== Agriculture and forestry ===
Geographic information is an essential component of the effective management of agricultural and forestry-related issues. The produced data and their integration in the "trade" applications aims to assist political leaders or sector-oriented professionals in the decision-making process. For example, the data help to identify in detail agricultural and forestry areas, to monitor land occupation evolution and deforestation in the framework of REDD+ projects (United Nations Collaborative Programme on Reducing Emissions from Deforestation and Forest Degradation in Developing Countries), or to determine different types of crops or forests.

Involved in sustainable development issues, IGN FI offers its services those working in the agriculture and forestry fields by producing data, providing GIS, trade information systems and decision support tools, or for completing project management assistance.

Examples:

- Monitoring and assessment of arable land in Egypt
- Crop inventory in Egypt

=== Environment and risk management ===
The pressure exercised on decision-makers concerning the fight to preserve the environment and to develop efficient prevention and risk management policies is stronger and stronger. At a national level, this could mean the creation of geographic reference databases as with the IGN initiative in the context of the Large Scale Referential (RGE) or an NSDI.

On a global level, IGN FI has always been a major player in the creation of geographic land occupation databases like Corine Land Cover (CoORdination of INformation on the Environment).

IGN FI assists those entities wishing to arm themselves with coherent and integrated environmental data in projects, such as developing a land occupation database in Burkina Faso

=== Defence and civil security ===
Strengthened by the privileged relationship of the IGN and the French Defence, IGN FI offers its expertise in geoinformation in the field of defense and civil security. Creation or updating of specific military maps, boundary marking, 3D visualization tools for territories or even the surveillance of exposed works, IGN FI assists its clients in the strictest confidentiality.

=== Energy and networks ===
The energy sector seeks to optimise the knowledge of distribution networks (pipelines, electric lines, conduits) in order to reinforce on one hand their ability to intervene, maintain, expand and implement, and on the other hand, to reinforce their contingency plans in the case of disasters. They must also adapt to international environmental standards that are becoming more and more stringent, all while maintaining their productivity Network managers thus need reliable geographic data, turnkey business information systems adapted to the location of their assets, the management of their distribution networks, risk management, the study of new implantation sites. IGN FI assists them in implementing customised solutions that range from the simple mapping of a site to the implementation of a comprehensive geographic information system. IGN France International assists those involved in the energy field and brings them a better knowledge of their networks, increased development and reinforced intervention ability.

== Products ==
Even though IGN France International does not sell "off-the-shelf" items, it offers a range of products that it adapts to the specific needs of its clients. The company thus positions itself in the 3D market in the field of urbanisation, cartographic production chains or business applications in the field of land and property management. These products were developed in the IGN's research laboratories.

=== Reference3D ===
Reference3D® is a unique and homogenous global geographic reference system allowing the representation and analysis of territories. It targets both public and private entities (national mapping agencies, Defence organisations, governments). It is the fruit of a partnership between the French Defence, the IGN and Spot Image. The tool is made up of three layers:

- Digital elevation model
- An orthoimage database
- Metadata for quality and traceability

Reference3D® offers important coverage (more than 50 million km^{2} are already available) and supports many applications:

- Image orthorectification
- Flight simulation, information for arms systems
- Cartographic creation and updating
- Evaluation and foresight in strategic areas
- Risk prevention and crisis management

=== Geoview ===
Geoview®, the production tool of the IGN, is made for all data-producing structures (national mapping agencies, defence organisations). This comprehensive cartographic data production software combines the following business functions within the same process:

- Image processing
- Photogrammetry
- Cartography

Geoview® enables the production of digital elevation models, orthoimages and 2D vector and 3D databases. It is made up of four modules:

- Standard module
- Geometric module
- Altimetric module
- Cartographic layout module

IGN FI concedes Geoview® in the form of capacity building in the context of the different projects that it leads abroad.

=== 3D Urbanis ===
3D Urbanis is made using BATI3D, the IGN's production tool and fruit of 10 years of research within the MATIS laboratory (Methods of Analysis for Image processing and Stereorestitution). This product targets all structures involved in urbanisation (authorities, urban planners, elected officials). 3D Urbanis has numerous goals:

- Enhancement of the urban territory and its heritage
- Highlighting a city's potential for economic development
- Optimising urban development while respecting environmental constraints
- Elaborating its projects while keeping the impact of different nuisances in mind (atmospheric, sound)
- Seeing projects as a whole while taking all factors into account (natural resources, transportation)
- Taking rapid action/anticipating
- Identifying alternative solutions in crisis situations (detours, evacuation plans)

The 3D georeferenced data of a city, once integrated into the dedicated software, make up a decision-support, dialoguing and communication tool.

=== CAMA Solution (land assessment) ===
Developed by IGN FI, this is a tool made for those who wish to accurate calculate land values. It is used to calculate the value of land and property. Configured according to the specificities of the local authorities, IGN FI's CAMA strictly respects international assessment standards. IGN FI's CAMA works on a GIS platform and is made up of seven specific modules:

- Data management
- Analysis of market sales
- Estimation and choice of assessment methods
