= Navit =

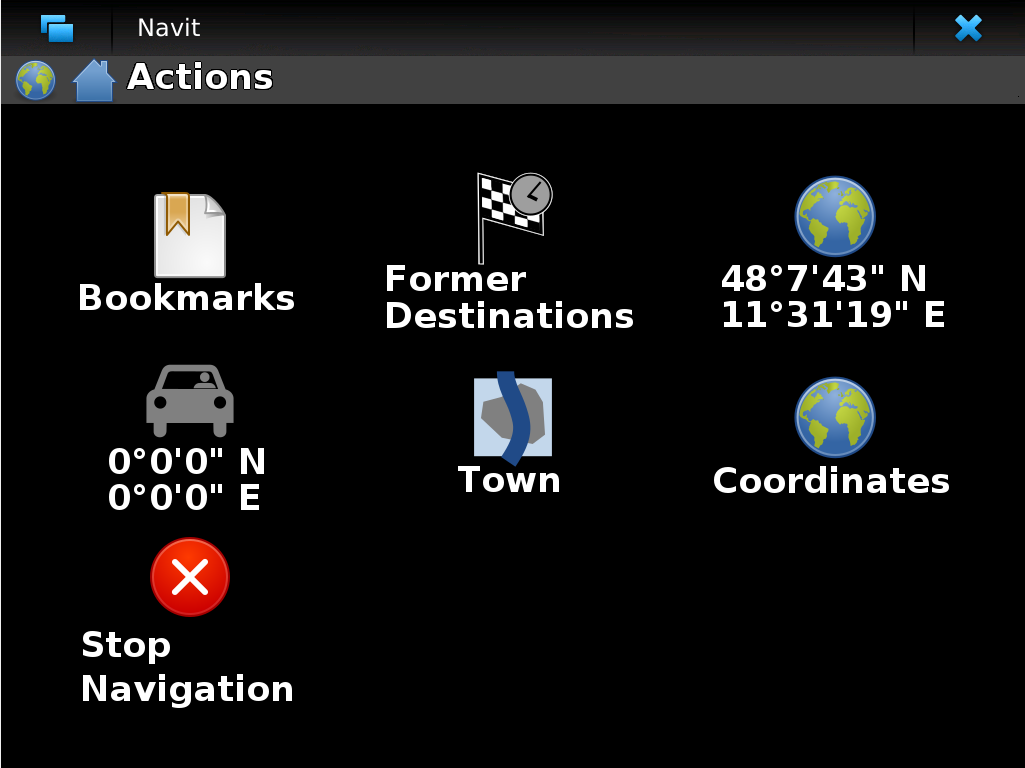
- Developers: Michael Farmbauer, Martin Schaller, Alexander Atanasov, Pierre Grandin and others
- Release: November 21, 2005
- Stable release: 0.5.8 / 22 November 2026; 0 days' time
- Written in: C, C++
- Available in: 39 languages
- Type: Satellite navigation
- License: GNU General Public License
- Website: www.navit-project.org
- Repository: github.com/navit-gps/navit

Navit is a free and open-source, modular, touch screen friendly, car navigation system with GPS tracking, realtime routing engine and support for various vector map formats. It features both a 2D and 3D view of map data.

Navit supports a variety of operating systems and hardware platforms including Windows, Windows CE, Linux, macOS, Android, iPhone, and Palm webOS. The Win CE version can run on a GPS device like tomtom or cartrek.

Navit can be used with several sources of map data, notably OpenStreetMap and Garmin maps.

== See also ==
- GPS navigation software
