= Mapopolis =

GPS navigation software company, 1999–2007

Mapopolis Navigator was a PDA/smartphone GPS navigation software created by Mapopolis. Mapopolis used data from Navteq. Mapopolis Navigator files use a proprietary format and make it impossible for users to export their custom POIs.

The Software is notable for its highly compressed map data,which allowed detailed street maps to fit within the limited storage of early devices.

It offered real time traffic updates a pioneering feature for handheld GPS navigation.

== History ==
Starting in 1999, Mapopolis first released software for the Palm OS and later added software for Pocket PC handhelds and Windows smartphones. Mapopolis created the first real-time traffic service (Mapopolis ClearRoute), providing real-time route updates based on traffic conditions.

By April 1, 2007, Mapopolis had discontinued sales of its consumer software. Map downloads remained available for at least one year past that date for registered users who purchased the product and still did not use up their full 1-year allowance.
