= Petal Maps =

Map service offered by Huawei

- Website type: Web mapping
- Available in: Multilingual
- Owner: Huawei
- Creator: Huawei
- Website: petalmaps.com
- Commercial: Yes
- Registration: Optional
- Launched: 26 October 2020; 5 years ago
- Current status: Active, developing
- Written in: C++ (back-end), JavaScript, XML, Ajax (UI)

Petal Maps is a map service based on TomTom provided by Huawei to devices with the operating system HarmonyOS, Android and iOS. It offers satellite imagery, aerial photography, 3D view surroundings, turn-by-turn navigation, head-up display and route planning for traveling by foot, car, bike, and public transportation.

== Honors ==
In 2021, Petal Maps was awarded the Red Dot Design Award.

== Features ==
=== Basic ===
Petal Maps offers the ability to zoom in and out to display the map. The user can control the map with the mouse to move to the desired location. Users can enter an address, intersection, or general area to search on the map.

If someone wants to search for "cakes in London" to find restaurants that serve that dish near the city. Searches can find a wide range of restaurants, hotels, theaters, and general businesses.

- Maps are sourced from Huawei.
- 3D view of the maps
- Satellite view.

=== Images provided by satellite ===
Currently the satellite view of Petal Maps is only available in the Petal Maps mobile app and not on the website.

== Mobile app ==
Petal Maps
- Original author: Huawei
- Release: October 26, 2020; 5 years ago
- Operating system: HarmonyOS; Android; iOS

Petal Maps is available as a mobile app for the HarmonyOS, Android and iOS mobile operating systems. It was released in October 2020 for all Huawei devices through AppGallery, and in June 2021 for all Android devices through Google Play. As of March 2022, Petal Maps was released on the App Store for iOS users. It was released as a replacement for Google Maps.
