= CoMaps =

Offline, privacy-focused map navigation app

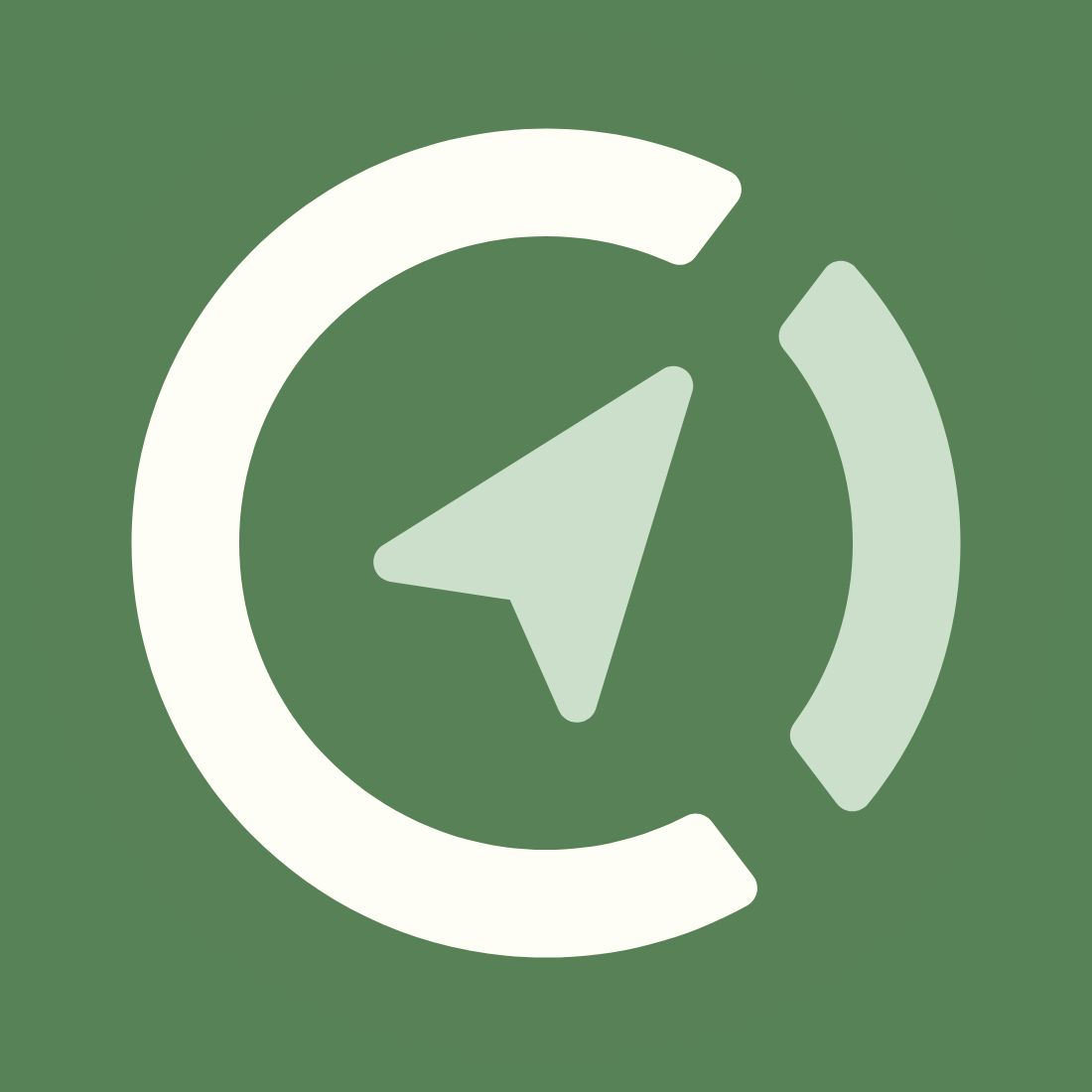

- Developer: CoMaps Contributors
- Release: 1 June 2025; 17 months ago
- Stable release: 2026.11.07-16 / 7 November 2026; 2 days ago
- Written in: C++ (core), Java (Android), Objective-C, Swift (iOS)
- Operating system: Android, iOS, MacOS, Linux
- Predecessor: Organic Maps
- License: Apache License 2.0
- Website: www.comaps.app
- Repository: codeberg.org/comaps/comaps

CoMaps is a community-driven, free and open-source, offline navigation app that uses map data from OpenStreetMap (OSM). The app is designed to function without internet connectivity by downloading maps for offline use. CoMaps emphasizes privacy, transparency, and community collaboration, aiming to provide a navigation solution that is not only easy to use, but also respects user data and fosters open participation.

== Features ==
=== Privacy ===
CoMaps prioritizes user privacy by not collecting personal data or tracking user locations.

=== Offline maps ===
CoMaps functions entirely offline through downloading of maps in advance. Once maps are downloaded, navigation, search, and route planning do not require an internet connection. The app offers offline maps of the world, including cycling routes, hiking trails, walking paths, contour lines, elevation profiles, peaks, and slopes.

=== Low battery consumption ===
The app is designed to optimize battery usage during navigation.

=== Navigation ===
CoMaps provides navigation for various activities, including hiking, biking, driving, and public transport. It supports turn-by-turn navigation with voice guidance and includes search for information on the map and functionality for saving bookmarks.

=== Styles and layers ===
CoMaps provides two map styles – a default one as well as an outdoor-focused one – along with a subway overlay, which displays metro or suburban railway lines in cities like Berlin or Frankfurt.

== OpenStreetMap data ==
CoMaps integrates with the OpenStreetMap project, utilizing its crowdsourced map data. The app includes an in-app editor where people can contribute updates to the map, such as businesses and landmarks.

== Core principles ==
The CoMaps team created a set of principles as the foundation of the project:

1. Transparency
2. Community Decision-making
3. Not-for-profit
4. Open source
5. Privacy-focused
6. Collective funding
7. Assets for Public Interest

== History ==
The CoMaps project was initiated in response to growing concerns and dissatisfaction within the Organic Maps community. The original Organic Maps project, while initially promoted as an open community effort, faced significant issues related to governance, transparency, and the potential for shareholder profit at the expense of the community. These concerns were detailed in an open letter to Organic Maps shareholders. Despite some positive steps, the lack of a substantive resolution led to the decision by the community contributors to start a new independent project.

The first public release of CoMaps was a preview version for Android made available 1 June 2025 on Codeberg. On 19 June 2025 the app was made available on F-Droid and on 3 July 2025 CoMaps announced general availability of the app in the Play Store and App Store. The release of CoMaps was covered in various technology news portals, such as MSN and ZDNET.

As of May 2025, the project is on Open Collective under the Platform 6 fiscal host. The project is in an ongoing process to further formalize its governance for a long-term non-profit or public interest legal structure for the project.

In July 2025, CoMaps was chosen as the default map application for the iodéOS Android-based operating system after a vote by members of the community forum.

In May 2026, CoMaps was chosen to replace Organic Maps as the default map application for the CalyxOS Android-based operating system.

== See also ==
- Comparison of free off-line satellite navigation software
- List of free and open-source software packages
- Comparison of satellite navigation software
- OpenStreetMap
- OsmAnd
- Organic Maps
