= Christine Darve =

French engineering scientist (born 1972)

Christine Darve is a French engineering scientist specializing in superconducting components for high-energy physics (HEP) experiments and supporting the scattering science community. She works in Sweden as a Senior Engineering Scientist at the European Spallation Source (ESS) in Lund. She previously worked at CERN and Fermi National Accelerator Laboratory (FNAL). Darve co-founded the African School of Physics (ASP) and has been involved in several international scientific outreach and education initiatives.

== Early life and education ==
Darve was born in Sainte-Marie-de-Cuines, Savoie, France, a village in the French Alps. She completed her classes preparatoires at the Lycée Vaucanson in Grenoble, before pursuing engineering studies at the Institut polytechnique de Sevenans in northeastern France. In 1996, she received a French Diplome d’Ingénieur in Thermomechanics of Systems and Materials. Her student work focused on thermomechanical analysis, and included placements at the physics research institutes of CEA Paris-Saclay and CERN.

Alongside her professional career, Darve pursued doctoral studies in fluid dynamics at Northwestern University in the United States. She received her Ph.D. in 2011. Her dissertation, Phenomenological and Numerical Studies of Superfluid Helium Dynamics in the Two-Fluid Model, was jointly supervised by Neelesh A. Patankar and Steven Van Sciver.

== Career ==
After beginning a student placement at CERN in 1995, working on the CMS experiment, Darve held a fellowship during which she contributed to the design and operation of the a thermal prototype for the Large Hadron Collider (LHC) cryostats.

In 1999, she joined Fermi National Accelerator Laboratory in Batavia, Illinois , where she worked as an Engineering Scientist until 2011. Her work included the design and operation of components developped through the US-LHC collaboration, contributions to Tevatron operations, and participation in the commissioning of the LHC.

She also contributed to the design and operation of test stands for several HEP projects, including the Muon Collider, a liquid hydrogen absorber, the first superconducting radio-frequency (SRF) cavities and cryomodules, and other HEP experiments.

In 2011, Darve joined ESS as the leader of the SRF cavities and cryomodules programme, a position she held until 2019. She coordinated an international collaboration, largely based on in-kind contributions from CEA, CNRS, INFN and STFC, enabling the technical design and implementation of the ESS cold linac. The book " Cryogenic Technologies at the European Spallation Source A big science case study "provides a description of the SRF accelerator and its cryogenics technologies.

She subsequently took up her current position as a Senior Engineering Scientist, coordinating ESS's In-Kind contributions programme and knowledge transfer activities in preparation for steady-state operations.

== International outreach and scientific activities ==
In 1998, Darve began her scientific outreach and volunteering activitities by organising a summer school in Sarajevo, entitled “The WWW: a Window on Science and Technology”, and serving as secretary of Physique-Sans-Frontieres. In 2009, she co-founder and was the main organizer of the African School of Fundamental Physics and Applications.

She also launched two Massive Open Online Courses (MOOCs): the Nordic Particle Accelerator Program (NPAP) and Accelerate Your Teaching (AYT). These initiatives aim to promote accessible education and capacity building in physics and accelerator science.

Darve is a former Chair of the Forum on International Physics (FIP) at the American Physical Society (APS). She currently chairs the FIP Outreach & Communication Committee, which supports the PHYSICS MATTERS colloquium series

She also chairs the IUPAP Working Group on Particle Accelerators for Science and Society (WG14)]and supports the IUPAP&UNESCO International Colloquia on Physics For Society.

Darve is also involved in EIROforum, FASEM (French-Swedish Academy for Scattering Experiments and Modeling), HEPTech and other inititiatives bringing together academia, research infrastructures and industry.

== Recognition ==
Darve was elected a Fellow of the American Physical Society, following a nomination from the APS Forum on International Physics "for sustained contribution to specification, design, construction, and operation of critical components of superconducting linear accelerators, and for leadership in expanding the reach of physics and educational outreach and dissemination of knowledge generated through large scale science facilities around the world".

In 2024, Darve received the CERN Alumni Directorate Award.

== Publications ==
Darve's scientific publications cover topics related to accelerator technology, superconducting radio-frequency systems, cryogenics, superfluid helium and high-energy physics instrumentation.
