= Science on Stage Europe =

The European initiative Science on Stage - initially launched as Physics on Stage in 1999 – is designed for European teachers to share good practice in science teaching and to discuss (new) ways of improving the quality of science lessons. This is driven by the foreseen lack of young scientists in all European countries. Science on Stage Europe believes that a good way to encourage schoolchildren to consider a career in science or engineering is to motivate and educate their teachers. Therefore, Science on Stage Europe provides a forum for science teachers to exchange teaching ideas and gives them access to science teaching resources.

== History ==
=== Physics on Stage ===
Organised by EIROforum, a collaboration of European research organisations, the initiative Science on Stage began in 1999 as Physics on Stage (POS), with financial support from the European Commission [POS was half funded by EIROforum]. EIROforum launched the initiative to address the decreasing numbers of young physicists. The first Physics on Stage festival was at CERN in Geneva, Switzerland, in 2000. Over the course of an inspiring week, more than 500 teachers from 22 countries shared activities and projects in a fair, in workshops, in performances and in presentations showed that physics can be fun. On the back of this success, Physics on Stage 2 was arranged in 2002 at ESA in Noordwijk, the Netherlands. Physics on Stage 3 followed a year later at the same location.

=== Science on Stage ===
The members of EIROforum soon realised that the lack of young scientists was not limited to the field of physics, so the initiative was broadened to cover all sciences and renamed Science on Stage. The first Science on Stage festival took place in 2005, again at CERN in Geneva, and the second in 2007 at ESRF/ILL in Grenoble, France. The format of the Physics on Stage festivals remained and still remains unchanged. In May 2008, the financial support of the European Commission ran out. In March 2009, under the guidance of Stage on Stage Germany the 27 European countries involved unanimously affirmed their wish to continue the cooperation. All participants stressed the importance of regular European festivals as the flagship of the European Science on Stage activities. Alternative funding would be sought for the festivals. In October 2008, the first of these alternatively funded Science on Stage festivals took place at Urania in Berlin, organised by Science on Stage Germany and sponsored by THINK ING., an initiative of the Federation of German Employers‘ Associations in the Metal and Electrical Engineering Industries. The second alternatively funded European Science on Stage festival took place from 16–19 April 2011 at the Ørestad Gymnasium in Copenhagen under the motto “Science Teaching: Winning Hearts and Minds”. It was funded by the Danish Ministry of Education and organised by Danish Science Communication and the Science on Stage Europe office. The next Science on Stage festival will take place from 25–28 April 2013 in Slubice and Frankfurt/Oder at the German-Polish border. For the first time, the festival will be organised by two countries, represented by the Adam Mickiewicz University in Poland and Science on Stage Germany, under the motto “Crossing Borders in Science Teaching”. 350 science teachers from across Europe will present their most innovative teaching ideas, workshops and performances. Participants are chosen at competitive national events or processes in each country involved.

== Organisation ==
Initially launched as an initiative in 2008, Science on Stage Europe became an officially registered non-profit association in January 2012, with headquarters in Berlin and recognised by German law.

Science on Stage Europe is organised in a bottom-up structure. The basis is the Science on Stage community in the participating countries. Each country has a national steering committee (NSC). The NSCs get together in the Science on Stage assembly and elect the executive board. The board is supported by invited experts and by the Science on Stage Europe office in Berlin. The Science on Stage international festivals take place every two years, as the culmination of all the national Science on Stage activities. The festivals are organised jointly by a European festival programme committee and a national organising committee.

== The countries involved ==
- Austria
- Belgium
- Bulgaria
- Canada
- Cyprus
- Czech Republic
- Denmark
- Finland
- France
- Germany
- Greece
- Hungary
- Ireland
- Italy
- Latvia
- Lithuania
- Luxembourg
- Malta
- Netherlands
- Norway
- Poland
- Portugal
- Romania
- Slovakia
- Slovenia
- Spain
- Sweden
- Switzerland
- United Kingdom
