= Elliott Sadler =

American racing driver (born 1975)

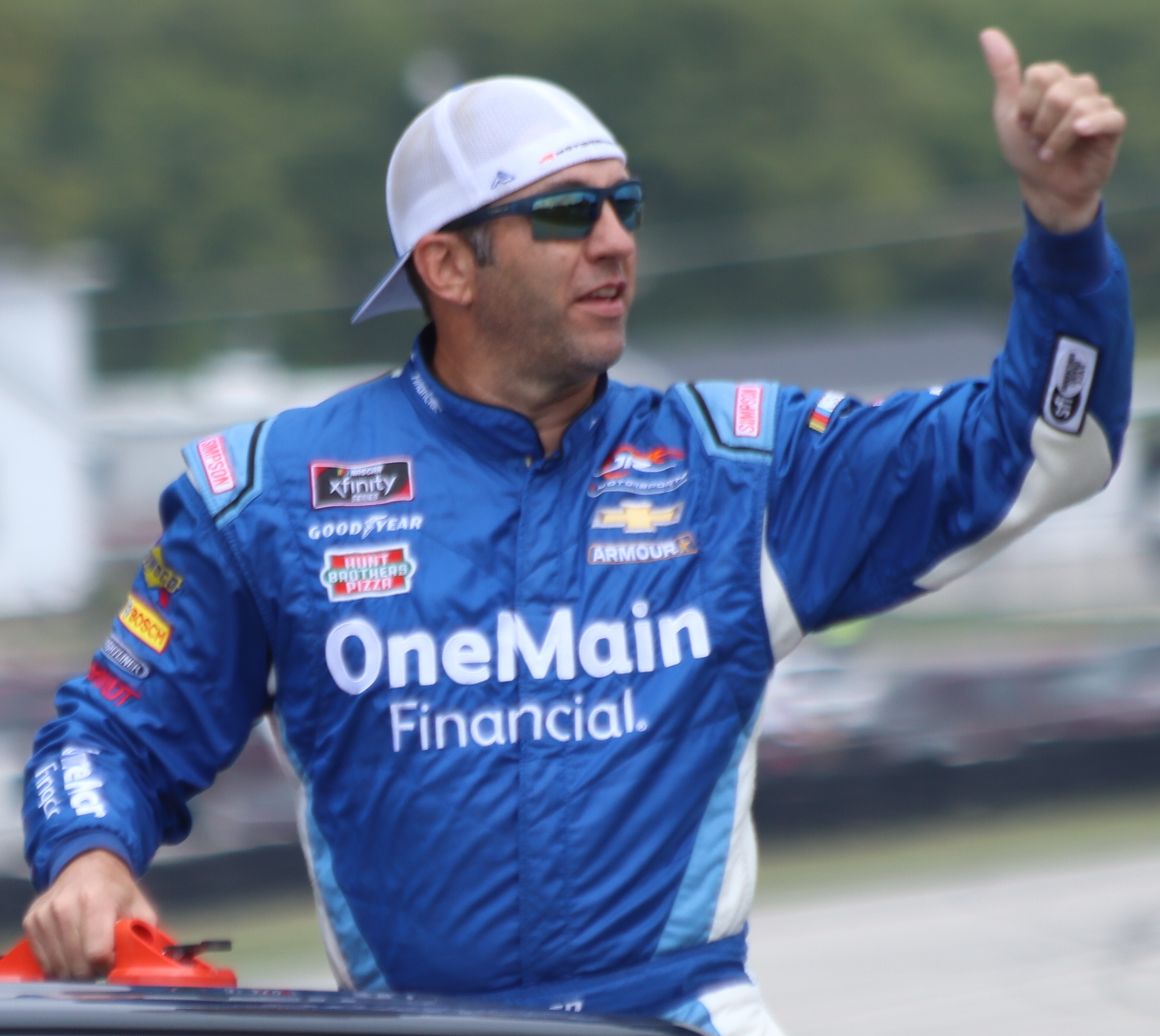
- Sadler at Road America in 2018
- Born: Elliott William Barnes Sadler; April 30, 1975 (age 51); Emporia, Virginia, U.S.
- Height: 6 ft 2 in (1.88 m)
- Weight: 195 lb (88 kg)
- Achievements: 1983–1984 Virginia State Karting Championship; North Carolina Gold Cup 1991–1992; 1995 South Boston Speedway track champion 2017 NASCAR Xfinity Series regular season champion 2004, 2006 Gatorade Duel Winner
- Awards: 2011 NASCAR Nationwide Series Most Popular Driver; 2016–2018 NASCAR Xfinity Series Most Popular Driver

NASCAR Cup Series career
- 438 races run over 16 years
- 2017 position: 53rd
- Best finish: 9th (2004)
- First race: 1998 Coca-Cola 600 (Charlotte)
- Last race: 2017 Coke Zero 400 (Daytona)
- First win: 2001 Food City 500 (Bristol)
- Last win: 2004 Pop Secret 500 (Auto Club)
Wins	Top tens	Poles
3	69	8

NASCAR O'Reilly Auto Parts Series career
- 397 races run over 22 years
- 2019 position: 46th
- Best finish: 2nd (2011, 2012, 2016, 2017)
- First race: 1995 Ford Credit 300 (South Boston)
- Last race: 2019 Rhino Pro Truck Outfitters 300 (Las Vegas)
- First win: 1997 Core States Advantage 200 (Nazareth)
- Last win: 2016 VisitMyrtleBeach.com 300 (Kentucky)
Wins	Top tens	Poles
13	227	18

NASCAR FedEx Freight Truck Series career
- 21 races run over 6 years
- 2026 position: 85th
- Best finish: 24th (2010)
- First race: 2000 Kroger 200 (Richmond)
- Last race: 2026 Black's Tire 250 (Richmond)
- First win: 2010 Pocono Mountains 125 (Pocono)
Wins	Top tens	Poles
1	10	2
- Statistics up to date as of November 6, 2026.

Elliott William Barnes Sadler (born April 30, 1975) is an American semi-retired professional stock car racing driver. He last competed part-time in the NASCAR Craftsman Truck Series, driving the No. 25 Ram 1500 for Kaulig Racing, and part-time in the SMART Modified Tour. Sadler is one of 36 drivers who have at least one win in each of NASCAR's top three series. A native of Emporia, Virginia, he is the younger brother of former NASCAR driver Hermie Sadler.

== Racing career ==
=== Early racing career ===
Sadler began racing in go-karts at the age of seven, and moved up to the Late Model stock car division at the local race track. His accomplishments include over 200 total wins, the 1983–84 Virginia State Karting Championship, and the North Carolina Gold Cup in 1991–92. When he turned eighteen, he moved to the Winston Racing Series and ran full-time beginning in 1993. That same year, he achieved his first victory. In 1995, he was crowned track champion at South Boston Speedway, winning thirteen races including a six-race winning streak.

Despite finding success in late model racing, Sadler was having a hard time catching the eye of NASCAR team owners. He sold all of his racing equipment to buy a Busch Series car, and ran some races as an independent in 1995 and early 1996. A race at Hickory Motor Speedway in early 1996 formed a connection between Sadler and Diamond Ridge Motorsports, the team he would drive for in late 1996 and all of 1997 and 1998 in the Busch Series.

=== Wood Brothers Racing ===
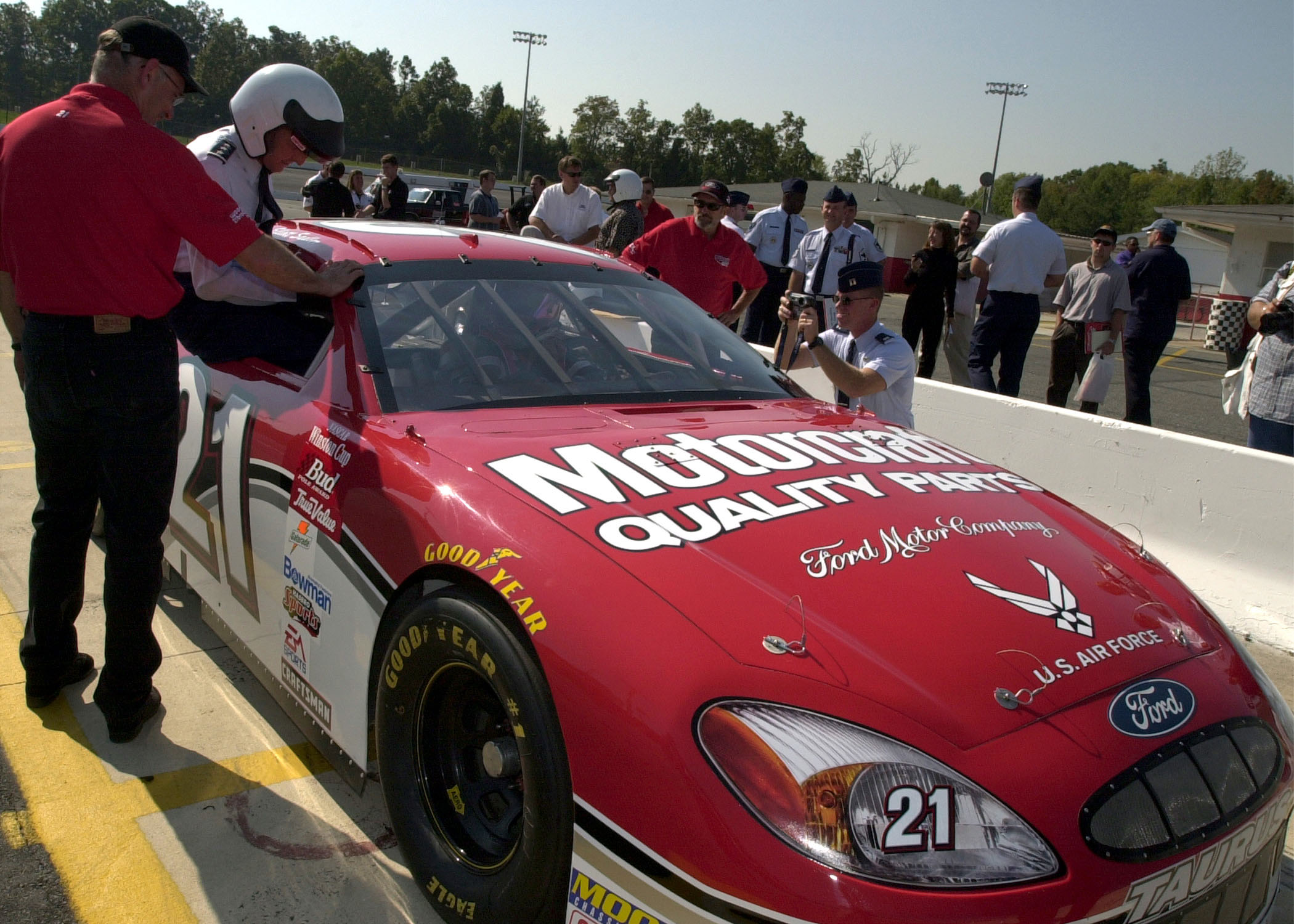
Sadler's 2002 Wood Brothers car at an event held in January 2003

Sadler moved up to the Cup Series full-time in 1999, driving the No. 21 Ford Taurus for Wood Brothers Racing. His best finish that year was tenth at Texas Motor Speedway, and he finished 24th in points, runner-up to Tony Stewart for Rookie of the Year honors. He also returned to the Busch Series on a part-time basis, filling in for the injured Andy Santerre for Innovative Motorsports, his best finish being fifth at California Speedway. He also drove a handful of races for Lyndon Amick. Sadler's only top-ten finish in 2000 was seventh at Bristol, after failing to qualify at Talladega Superspeedway, and he dropped to 29th in points.

The season also featured a chaotic crash at Michigan during practice that saw the car take flight after blowing a tire going into turn one, barrel rolling several times before coming to a rest on its wheels. Sadler recounted the story on The Dale Jr. Download in 2024, stating that the car flipped so high that it exceeded the height of the catchfence, which he attributed to a flare in the quarter panel created by the exploded tire that created lift as the car spun. He elaborated that the footage of the crash has only been seen sparingly since then because NASCAR has redacted the external camera video as to not fully reveal the nature of the incident.

In 2001, Sadler won his first Cup race at Bristol, making this the first win for Wood Brothers in eight years. He had another top-ten run in Daytona later that year, finishing third. After a run riddled with inconsistent finishes, he ended the season twentieth in points. With seven top-tens and a fall to 23rd in points in 2002, Sadler left for Robert Yates Racing to drive the No. 38 M&M's Ford, replacing Ricky Rudd.

=== Robert Yates Racing ===
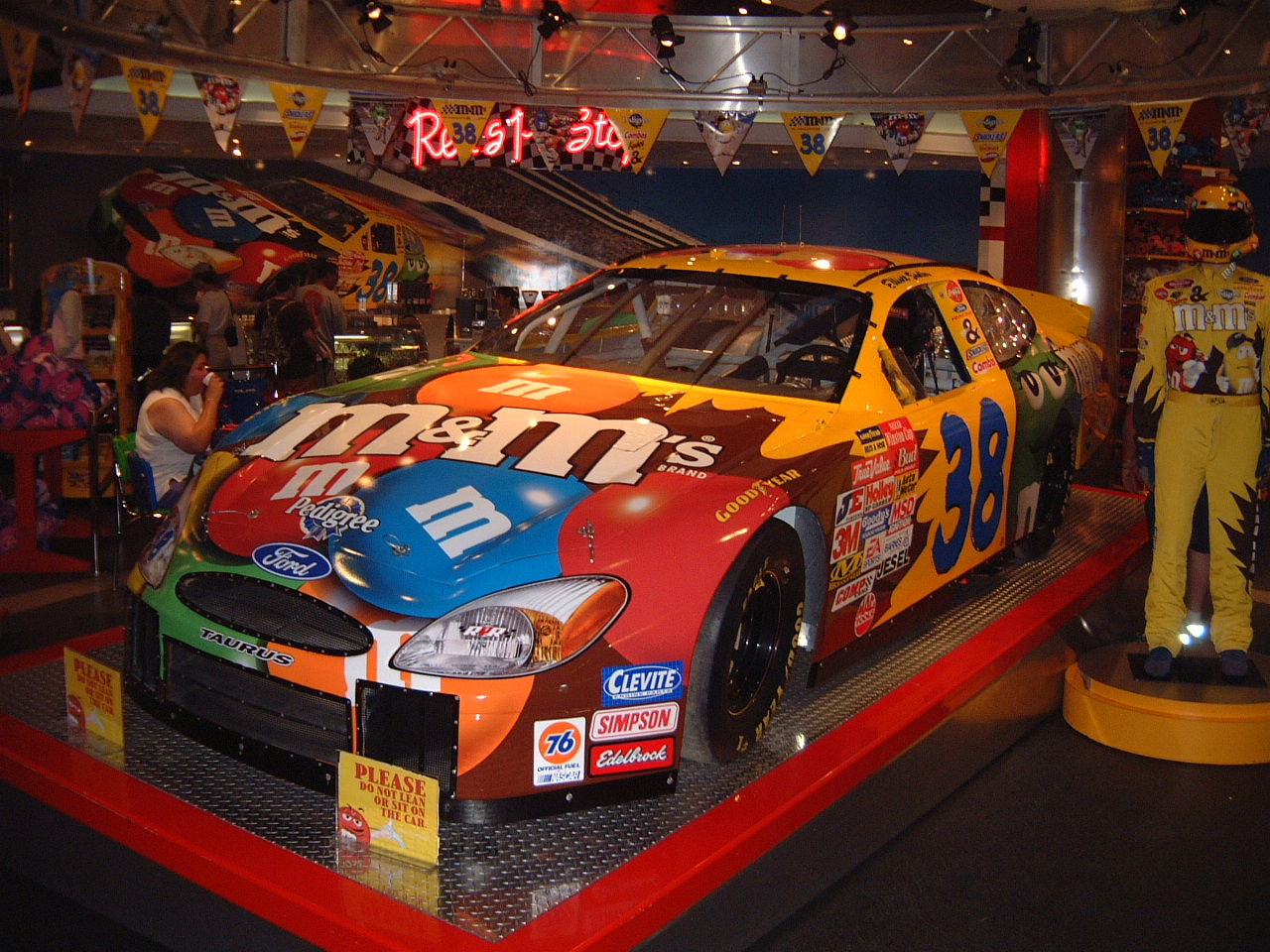
Sadler's 2003 No. 38 car on display at M&M's World

In 2003, his first season of competition with Robert Yates, Sadler won the pole at both Darlington Raceway and Talladega Superspeedway and finished 22nd in points. That fall, he had a vicious crash at Talladega after near-contact with Dale Earnhardt Jr. and touched the right-front fender of Kurt Busch. His car flew into the air, flipped twice, landed on his roof, spun towards the banking, and flipped six times. Sadler emerged uninjured (although he was airlifted to a local hospital for precautionary reasons).

Sadler started the 2004 season with a top-ten finish in the Daytona 500 and six races later, he won at Texas Motor Speedway for his second career win. He stayed in the top-ten in points all season and won at California Speedway, beating Kasey Kahne and Mark Martin. He made the Chase and finished a career-high ninth in the championship points standings. He had another flip-crash at Talladega on the final lap after he spun out and blew over onto his roof and landed on all four wheels and crossed the finish line in 22nd just in front of his brother, Hermie. Sadler also was uninjured in that crash, and he was even able to drive his car back to the garage.

Sadler failed to win a race again in the 2005 season; however, he did clinch four poles and finished thirteenth in the points standings. He also made 16 starts for Robert Yates in the Busch Series, driving the No. 90 Taurus, and had three top-five finishes. In 2006, Sadler won the pole at Talladega and finished 22nd in points. He made seven starts in the Busch Series and his best finish was second at Richmond. After a lack of results, he left RYR midway through 2006 for Gillett Evernham Motorsports. Sadler, was also the cover driver for EA Sports’ NASCAR 07.

=== Evernham/Petty Motorsports ===
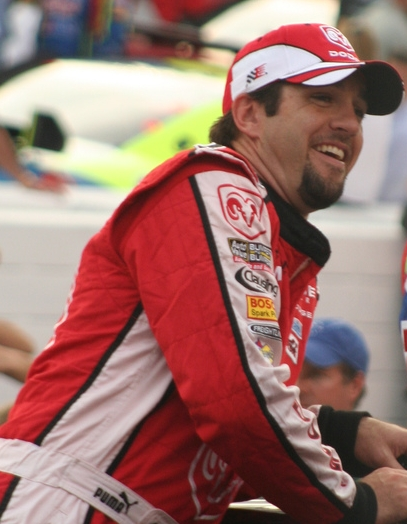
Sadler in 2007

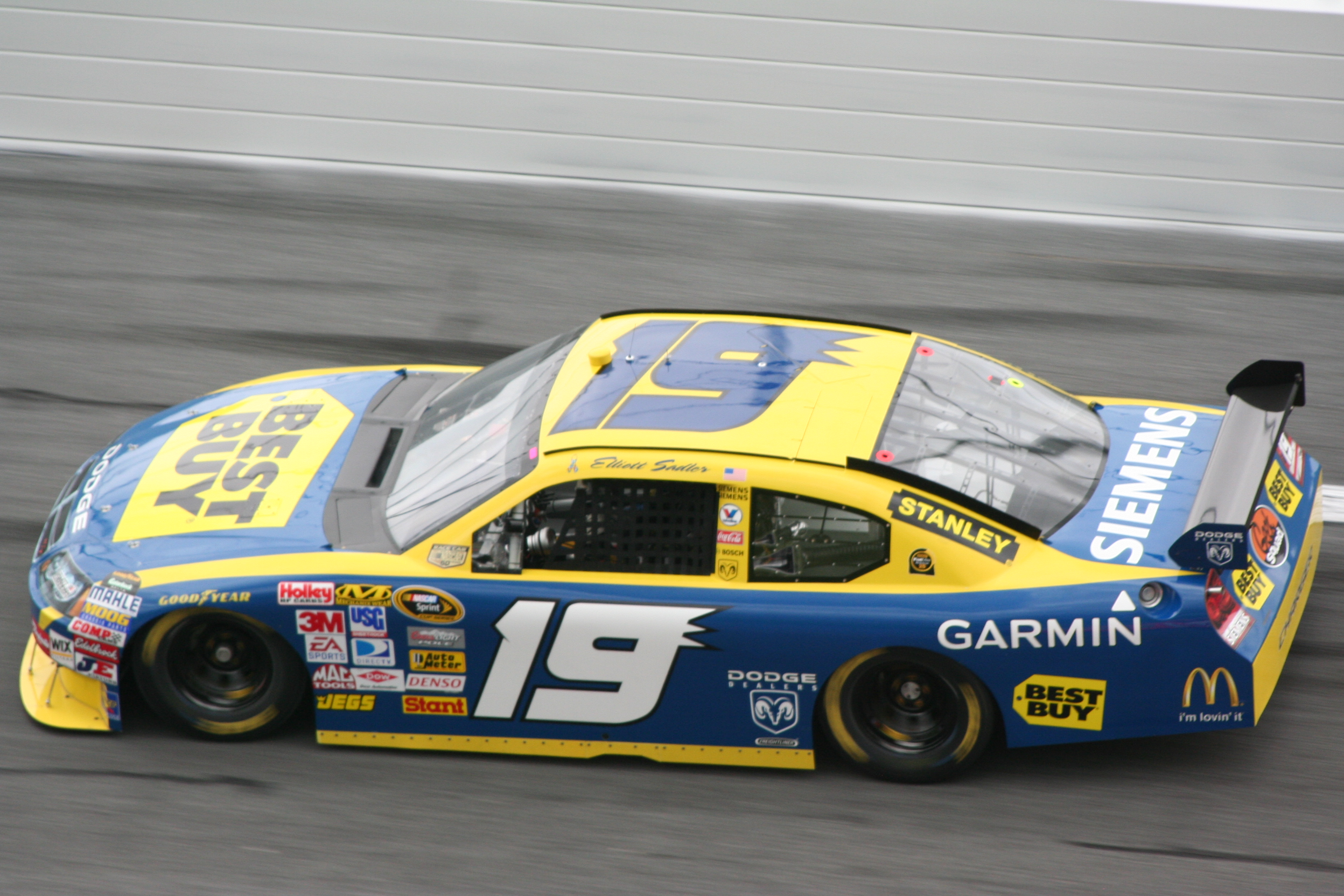
Sadler's 2008 Daytona 500 car for Gillett Evernham

Before the start of the 2007 Daytona 500, Sadler's team was among many others who faced disciplinary action for rule-infractions. Despite being docked 25 points, he still went on to score a season-best 6th-place finish. Sadler had many ups and downs throughout the season. In 2007, Sadler led 62 laps, posted two top-ten finishes and finished 25th in points. Sadler had the longest streak without a DNF than any other driver before failing to finish a race in 2007.

Sadler struggled in 2008, garnering only two top-fives, eight top-tens, and sixteen top-twenties. He had four DNF's and twelve finishes of thirtieth or worse. Sadler led 21 laps in 2008, his fewest since the 2000 season. He ended the year 24th in the points standings. In December 2008, it was reported that A. J. Allmendinger would replace Sadler in the No. 19 Best Buy Dodge for Gillett Evernham Motorsports in 2009. Sadler threatened a lawsuit for breach of contract; however, the lawsuit was dropped after the GEM – Petty Enterprises merger and he returned to the ride for 2009.

After all of the offseason issues, Sadler found himself in the No. 19 Stanley Tools Dodge for Richard Petty Motorsports in the 2009 Sprint Cup Series season. In the 2009 Daytona 500, Sadler took the lead on lap 123 and stayed in the lead for the final stages in the race. On the last green flag lap Sadler got passed by Matt Kenseth and seconds later the caution came out. Kenseth wound up winning while Sadler came up in fifth. Sadler ended the year 26th in points.

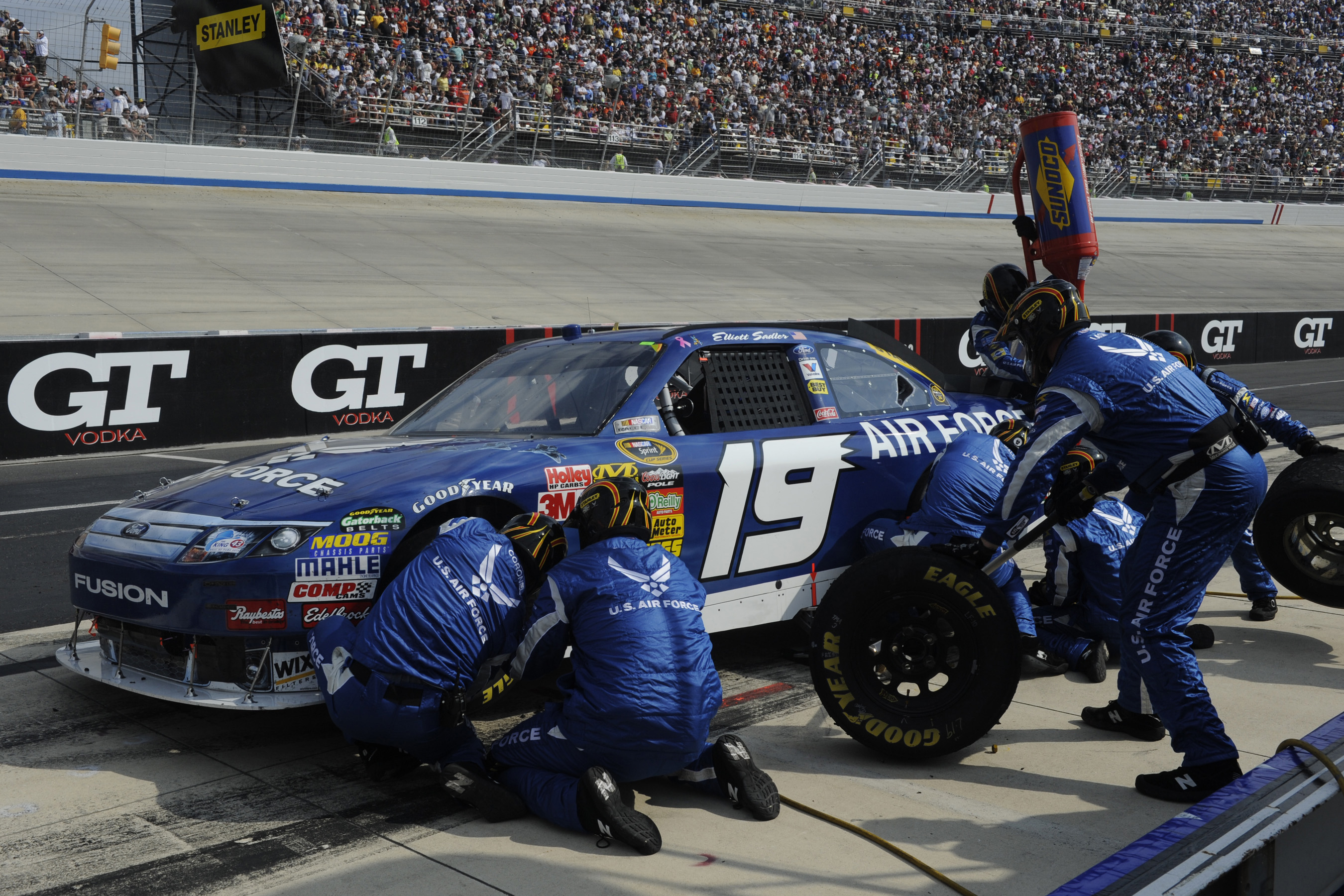
Sadler making a pit stop in his No. 19 RPM car at Dover in 2010

In 2010, Sadler returned to RPM to drive the No. 19 Ford with sponsorship from Stanley, Best Buy, and the United States Air Force. During the year, however, Sadler announced that he would be leaving the team after the 2010 season. He ran a part-time schedule in the Camping World Truck Series in the No. 2 Hunt Brothers Pizza Chevrolet Silverado for Kevin Harvick Incorporated. In this ride, Sadler won his first NASCAR race in six years at Pocono in the Pocono Mountains 125 in July. Sadler also made a one-off start for JR Motorsports in the No. 88 Chevrolet at the Dover 200 Nationwide Series event, finishing 31st after being involved in an accident during the early stages of the race.

The next day, Sadler was involved in a wreck where he hit the inside fence (a blind spot on the track, not well-recorded by video cameras) after being hit from behind by A. J. Allmendinger. Kurt Busch was hit from behind by Jimmie Johnson causing him to spin into Clint Bowyer who received little damage but still finished twelfth. The wreck was so horrific it threw the engine away from the car and caused the race to be red-flagged for 25 minutes to clean up the wreck. There were several reports by fans that his car flew through the air. With a grimace on his face, he climbed out of the car and laid down on the track. He was taken to the medical facility where he later emerged and gave an interview to on hand media personnel. He said he was fine & was a little sore, but had the breath knocked out of him and had taken "the hardest hit of his career" at Pocono. He was proud of his team back home that had built a safe car and of the pit crew and of all of the hard work they had put into the race thus far. On August 3, Sadler announced on NASCAR Now that NASCAR told him it was the hardest head-on crash ever recorded in NASCAR history. On November 5, 2010, Sadler won the pole for the AAA Texas 500 at Texas Motor Speedway qualifying at 195.397, the fastest qualifying speed since 1999.

=== KHI and RCR ===
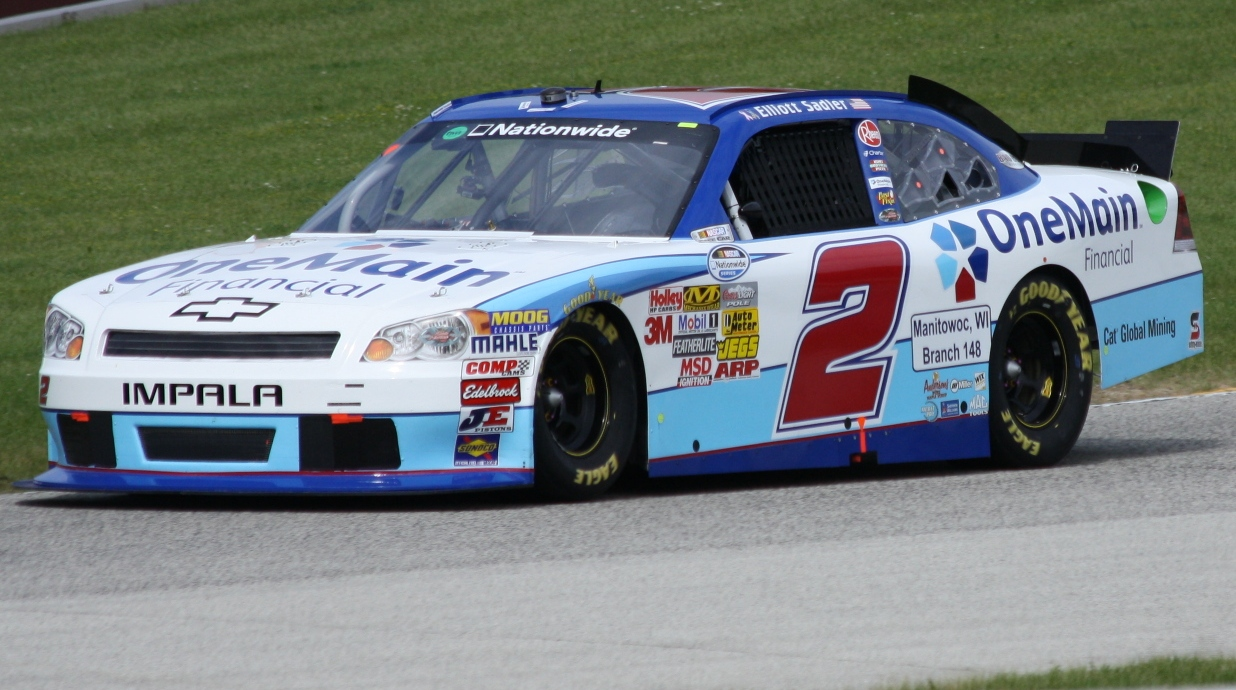
2011 KHI car at Road America

In late-2010, Sadler was at a crossroads in his career. He admitted in an interview that he wasn't enjoying the sport any longer. He had gone winless for six seasons, and was making no progress in his efforts to winning a championship. By the persuasion of former teammate Dale Jarrett, Sadler stepped down from the Cup Series to try to make a living in the lower-divisions.

On November 5, 2010. Sadler announced a two-year deal to drive the No. 2 OneMain Financial Chevrolet for Kevin Harvick Inc. in the Nationwide Series and also will drive a selected number of races in the Camping World Truck Series. Sadler took the championship points lead in the Nationwide Series after the 11th race in the 2011 season. He ended up finishing second in points with 24 top-ten finishes in 34 events.

At the end of the 2011 season, KHI's Nationwide Series operations were absorbed by Richard Childress Racing and Sadler moved to RCR for 2012, remaining in the No. 2. In addition, Sadler ran in the 2012 Daytona 500 for RCR in the No. 33 Chevrolet.

On March 3, 2012, Sadler won the Nationwide Series Bashas' Supermarkets 200 at Phoenix, his first win since October 31, 1998 at North Carolina Motor Speedway, a span of 91 races.

Sadler had been announced on March 3 as the third driver of the Michael Waltrip Racing's No. 55 Toyota, but Childress wanted Sadler to focus on the Nationwide championship, so the deal was nixed.

On March 17, Sadler won at Bristol, making it the first year since the mid-1990s that the first four NNS races have been won by non-Sprint Cup drivers. It also had Sadler winning two of the first four races of the season.

On July 22, Sadler held off hard charging Ricky Stenhouse Jr. at Chicagoland Speedway to collect his third win of the season, and held on to his point lead over Stenhouse and Austin Dillon.

Sadler got black flagged after supposedly jumping the restart at the inaugural Indiana 250. Elliott's point lead vanished nearly after the black flag. The week after he dominated the U.S. Cellular 250 at Iowa en route to his fourth win of the year. Heading into Phoenix, Sadler was once again caught up in a late crash, which ended his championship hopes. He would finish second in points again to Stenhouse. He would later announce his move to Joe Gibbs Racing for 2013, taking OneMain Financial with him.

=== Joe Gibbs Racing ===
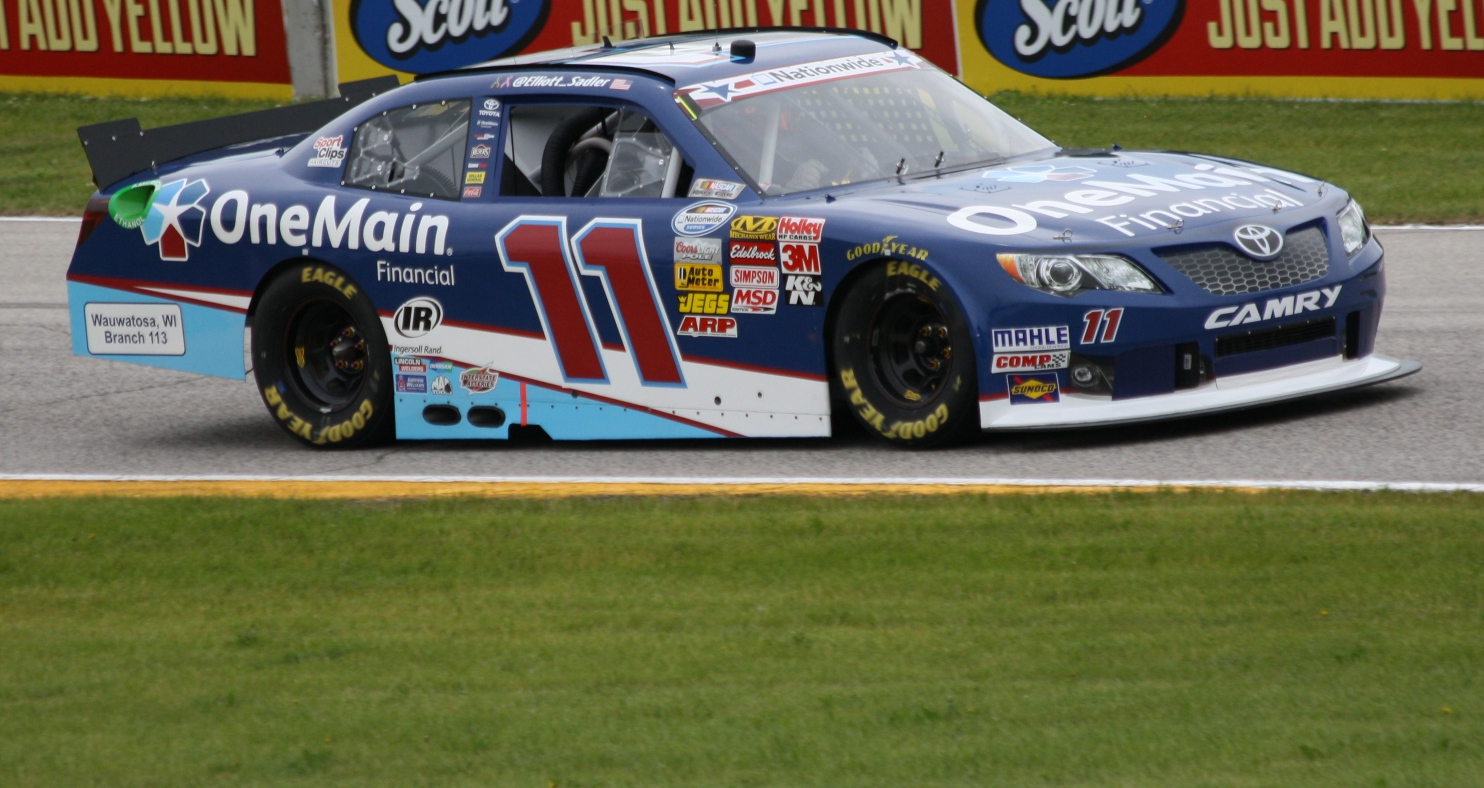
2013 JGR car at Road America

In addition to running the full Nationwide Series schedule for Joe Gibbs Racing, Sadler announced in March that he would be competing in three Sprint Cup Series events for the team, driving the No. 81 Toyota. Sadler ran one race with Alert Energy before it and other Caffeine gums were pulled from the market. He attempted Talladega with Doublemint but failed to qualify due to rain and not entered in fall race with no reasons.

At Loudon in 2013, Sadler was running in the top-ten with ten laps left in the race. With six laps to go, Sadler pulled a block on Regan Smith. The two drivers got contact that sent Sadler around into the grasses. After the race ended, Sadler and Smith argued on pit road with Sadler vowing to Smith that "you will not win this championship mark my words.". Although Smith apologized, their rivalry was renewed during the inaugural race at the Mid-Ohio Sports Car Course a few weeks later, when Smith passed Sadler for a spot through contact. When Sadler was running behind Smith a few laps later, Sadler retaliated, sending Smith into a crash collecting Ron Fellows. After medical issues forced Brian Vickers to sit out the end of the 2013 racing season, Sadler was named to drive the No. 55 MWR for the final four Sprint Cup races of 2013.

After going winless, he won the 2014 Aaron's 312 after defending Chris Buescher and Regan Smith, It was his first win since 2012 and his first with Gibbs.

On October 31, 2014, it was announced Sadler would join Roush Fenway Racing in the No. 1 for 2015. During the O'Reilly Auto Parts Challenge, Sadler became ill and exited the car during the first caution. He was relieved by Clint Bowyer.

=== Roush Fenway Racing ===
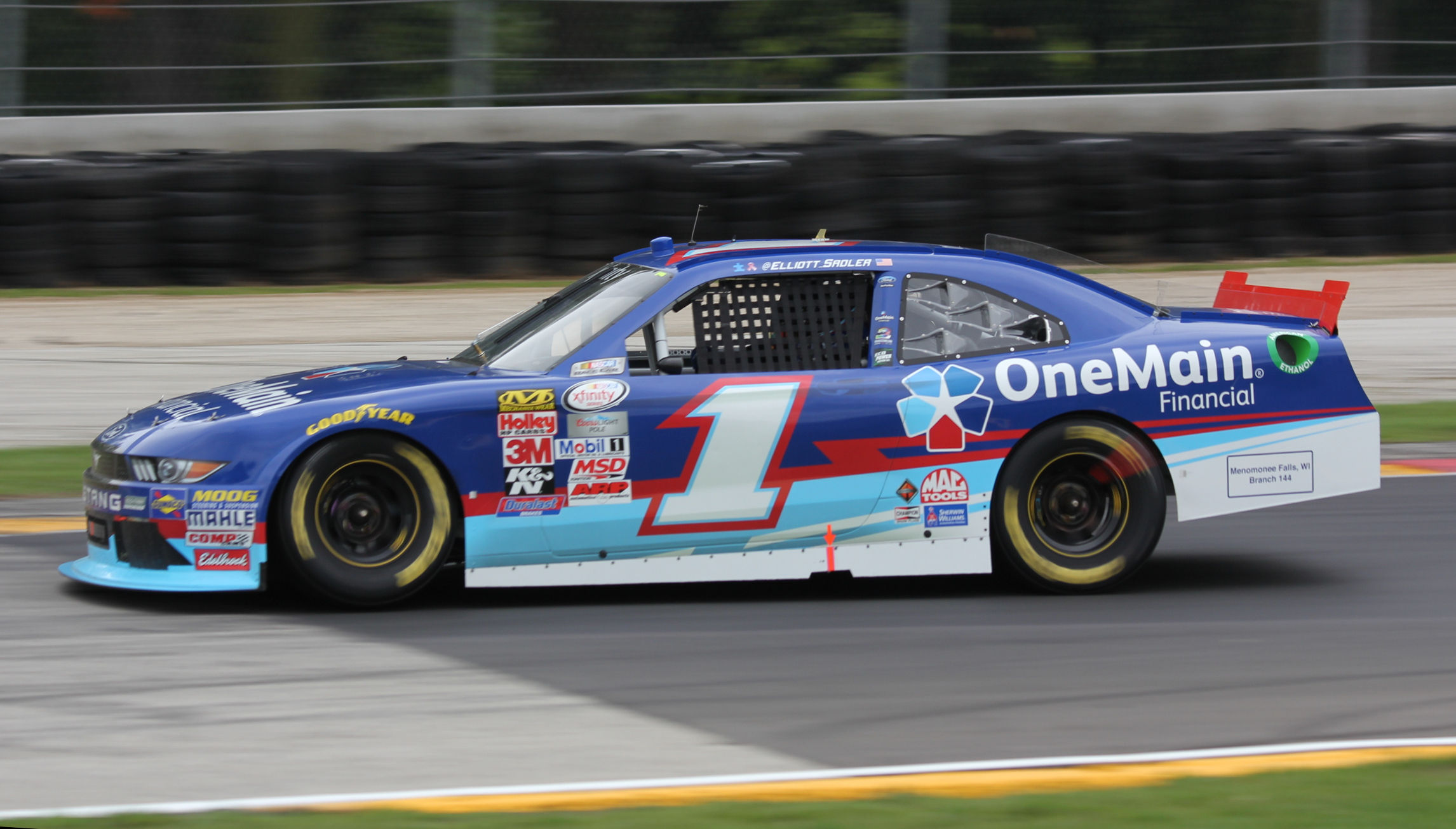
2015 Roush Fenway car at Road America

On October 30, 2014, Roush Fenway Racing announced that Sadler would drive the No. 1 car in the Xfinity Series in 2015. This marked Sadler's reunion with former owner and engine builder Doug Yates, and his fourth stint with manufacturer Ford. In that season, he got four top-fives and seventeen top-tens, although he did not get a win that season, and finished sixth in the standings.

=== JR Motorsports ===
On October 2, 2015, Dale Earnhardt Jr. announced that Sadler would drive for JR Motorsports in the Xfinity Series in 2016. This marked the fifth team Sadler has joined since the 2011 season when he competed for Kevin Harvick Inc. His journey has taken him from KHI to Richard Childress Racing (2012), Joe Gibbs Racing (2013–2014), Roush Fenway and now JRM. On January 6, 2016, Sadler's car number was officially revealed as No. 1.

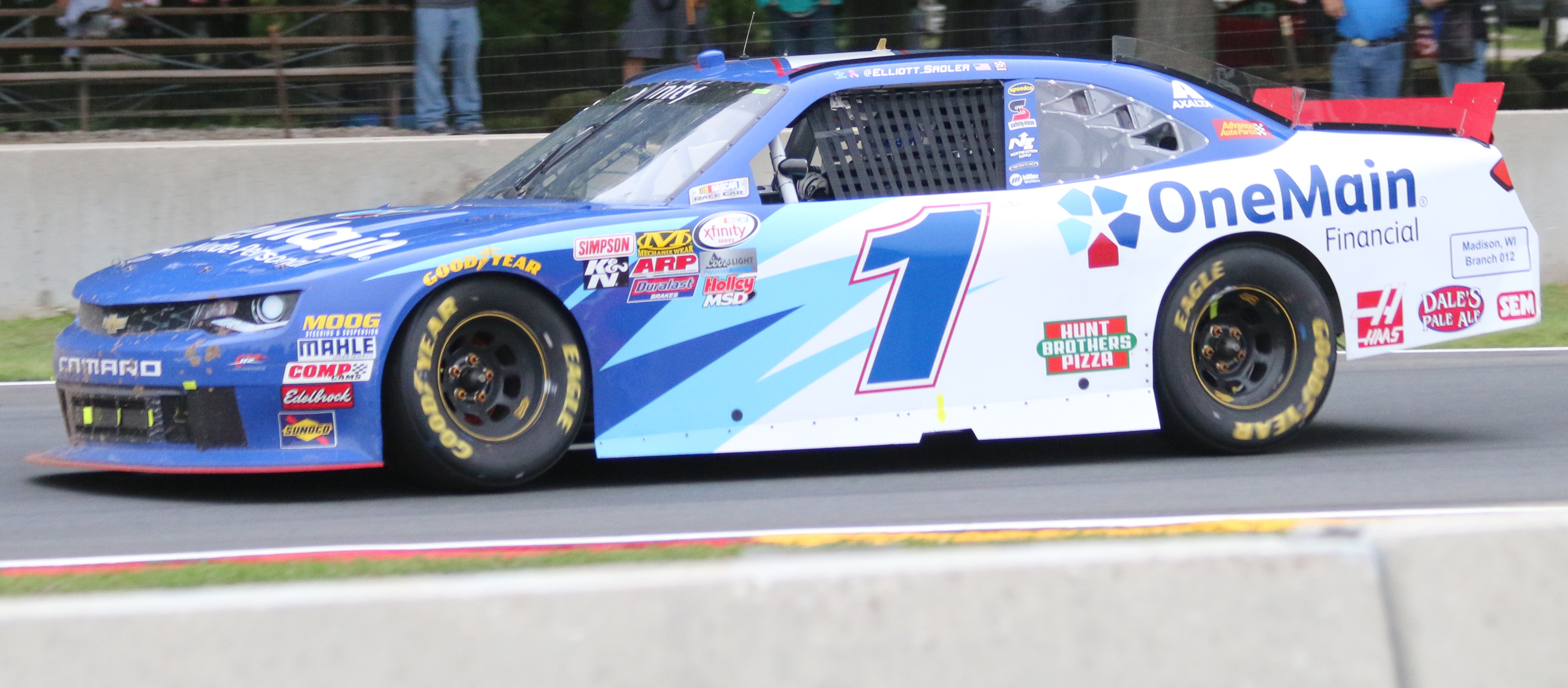
2016 JR Motorsports car at Road America

Sadler started out his season with a few top-tens. Sadler ultimately broke through at the Sparks Energy 300 at Talladega. On the final lap, it looked like Sadler was set to being the runner-up. Sadler battled Joey Logano on the final lap. When Logano blocked, he spun out from contact from Elliott. Elliott dipped below the yellow line to avoid a spinning Joey. Brennan Poole passed Sadler for the lead just as a caution came out. After a five-minute delay, with both drivers, Poole and Sadler, waiting on the front-stretch for NASCAR's word, NASCAR ultimately determined that Sadler had been ahead at the moment of caution, dropping Poole to third, and elevating Sadler to the win. The finish was a 1–2 finish for JR Motorsports with Sadler winning and teammate Justin Allgaier finishing second.

Sadler would return to Victory lane at Darlington in the VFW Sport Clips Help A Hero 200, beating out Denny Hamlin. The two wins would automatically lock Sadler in the inaugural Xfinity Chase. Sadler was one of three drivers starting the chase with wins. In round one, Sadler won the race at Kentucky. Sadler, with a few more top tens, moved on to the championship four at Homestead-Miami Speedway. Sadler went on to score a second place finish in the championship for the third time in his career.

In 2017, Sadler returned to the Cup Series part-time with Tommy Baldwin Racing, driving the No. 7 in the Daytona 500. His last start in the Cup series was late in 2013. As one of the two fastest non-chartered cars in qualifying, he was able to lock himself into the race before the Can-Am Duels. He ended up qualifying for the next two plate races at Talladega in May and then Daytona in July and was going to drive in the Coca-Cola 600, but gave the ride to J. J. Yeley for an unknown reason.

In his 800th NASCAR start at Iowa's American Ethanol E15 250, Sadler came back from the rear of the field and ended up having a great night, but was still unable to get his first win of the season. He had a great shot to win Daytona but could not, instead pushing teammate William Byron past the overtime line as a crash took place, sealing the win for Byron.

Sadler clinched the first NASCAR Xfinity Series Regular Season Championship with a fifth-place finish in the Go Bowling 250 at Richmond Raceway.

Sadler entered the night with a 91-point edge over JR Motorsports teammate William Byron and needed to come out of the race ahead by at least 61 points in the standings. Sadler finished the race 95 points ahead of Byron. Sadler was officially awarded the championship trophy and the fifteen bonus points towards the NASCAR playoffs the following weekend at Chicagoland Speedway; the final race of the regular season. Despite not winning a single regular-season race, Sadler led the series with eleven top-fives, an average finish of 9.5, and spent all but two weeks on top of the points standings. Sadler entered the playoffs as the third seed behind William Byron and Justin Allgaier and scored his fourth second-place finish in the championship despite going winless. On February 17, 2018, he finished second to Tyler Reddick at Daytona International Speedway for the PowerShares QQQ 300 with a margin of 0.0004 seconds.

Sadler won the 2018 NASCAR Xfinity Series Most Popular Driver, making him the driver to win the most Most Popular Driver awards in Xfinity Series history, with four Most Popular Driver wins, winning it in 2011, 2016, 2017, and 2018.

=== Kaulig Racing ===
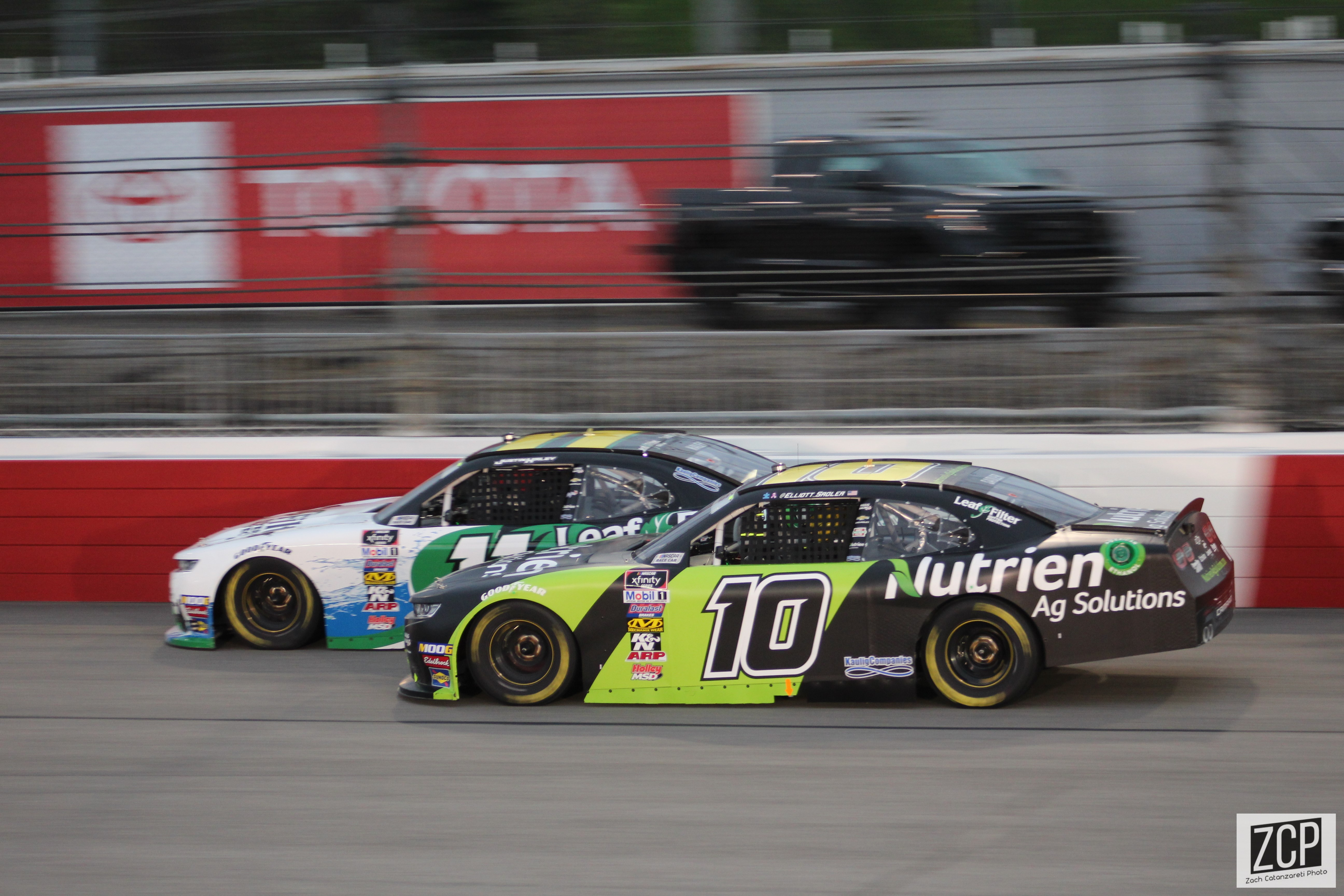
2019 Kaulig car at Richmond

On August 15, 2018, Sadler announced that he would retire from full-time competition at the end of the 2018 Xfinity Series season. He transitioned to a part-time schedule in NASCAR in 2019, joining Kaulig Racing for a two-race Xfinity slate in 2019 at Richmond and Las Vegas.

The 2019 Rhino Pro Truck Outfitters 300 at Las Vegas was his final start in the NASCAR national series. Driving a No. 10 designed after his 1993 late model, Sadler finished tenth.

=== Post-NASCAR ===
On February 24, 2026, it was revealed that Sadler would make a return to racing, where he would drive in the SMART Modified Tour race at South Boston Speedway for Sadler-Stanley Racing, a team that is co-owned by brother Hermie. On July 18, Sadler announced that he was going to drive in the Craftsman Truck Series for Kaulig Racing in the No. 25 at Richmond.

== Personal life ==
Sadler was a six-sport athlete in high school at Brunswick Academy, participating in football, basketball, baseball, cross country, soccer, and golf. He was recruited by over 20 universities to play college basketball, and ended up accepting a basketball scholarship from James Madison University in Harrisonburg, Virginia. However, he injured his knee before his freshman season and needed two surgeries, eventually quitting college to focus on racing. Sadler is heavily involved in the Autism Speaks charity.

Sadler was the cover athlete on EA Sports NASCAR 07 and was also on the special edition NASCAR 09.

Sadler is married to Amanda and they have two children.

== Motorsports career results ==
=== NASCAR ===
(key) (Bold – Pole position awarded by qualifying time. Italics – Pole position earned by points standings or practice time. * – Most laps led.)

==== Monster Energy NASCAR Cup Series ====
Monster Energy NASCAR Cup Series results
Year	Team	No.	Make	1	2	3	4	5	6	7	8	9	10	11	12	13	14	15	16	17	18	19	20	21	22	23	24	25	26	27	28	29	30	31	32	33	34	35	36	MENCC	Pts	Ref
1997	Team SABCO	40	Chevy	DAY	CAR	RCH	ATL	DAR	TEX	BRI	MAR	SON	TAL	CLT	DOV	POC	MCH	CAL	DAY	NHA	POC	IND	GLN	MCH	BRI	DAR	RCH	NHA	DOV	MAR	CLT; DNQ	TAL	CAR	PHO	ATL					N/A	-	
1998	Diamond Ridge Motorsports	92	Chevy	DAY	CAR	LVS	ATL	DAR	BRI	TEX	MAR	TAL	CAL	CLT; 42	DOV	RCH	MCH	POC	SON	NHA	POC	IND	GLN	MCH	BRI; 24	NHA	DAR	RCH	DOV	MAR	CLT	TAL	DAY	PHO	CAR	ATL				57th	128	
1999	Wood Brothers Racing	21	Ford	DAY; 40	CAR; 38	LVS; 33	ATL; 31	DAR; 36	TEX; 10	BRI; 26	MAR; 28	TAL; 29	CAL; 21	RCH; 23	CLT; 17	DOV; 27	MCH; 36	POC; 20	SON; 18	DAY; 22	NHA; 20	POC; 21	IND; 21	GLN; 18	MCH; 11	BRI; 35	DAR; 14	RCH; 17	NHA; 14	DOV; 12	MAR; 25	CLT; 26	TAL; 21	CAR; 18	PHO; 27	HOM; 18	ATL; 16			24th	3191	
2000	Wood Brothers Racing	21	Ford	DAY; 38	CAR; 28	LVS; 41	ATL; 14	DAR; 12	BRI; 41	TEX; 39	MAR; 29	TAL; DNQ	CAL; 43	RCH; 24	CLT; 21	DOV; 16	MCH; 27	POC; 16	SON; 38	DAY; 18	NHA; 16	POC; 29	IND; 34	GLN; 28	MCH; 40	BRI; 7	DAR; 18	RCH; 42	NHA; 13	DOV; 26	MAR; 32	CLT; 16	TAL; 17	CAR; 19	PHO; 30	HOM; 28	ATL; 42			29th	2762	
2001	Wood Brothers Racing	21	Ford	DAY; 18	CAR; 11	LVS; 20	ATL; 31	DAR; 17	BRI; 1	TEX; 16	MAR; 21	TAL; 39	CAL; 23	RCH; 23	CLT; 19	DOV; 18	MCH; 40	POC; 18	SON; 17	DAY; 3	CHI; 15	NHA; 40	POC; 26	IND; 23	GLN; 30	MCH; 15	BRI; 11	DAR; 29	RCH; 31	DOV; 14	KAN; 23	CLT; 37	MAR; 17	TAL; 40	PHO; 33	CAR; 23	HOM; 36	ATL; 24	NHA; 19	20th	3471	
2002	Wood Brothers Racing	21	Ford	DAY; 2	CAR; 31	LVS; 28	ATL; 19	DAR; 2	BRI; 41	TEX; 17	MAR; 28	TAL; 40	CAL; 39	RCH; 21	CLT; 33	DOV; 10	POC; 15	MCH; 26	SON; 6	DAY; 12	CHI; 21	NHA; 10	POC; 21	IND; 35	GLN; 43	MCH; 27	BRI; 42	DAR; 19	RCH; 34	NHA; 35	DOV; 25	KAN; 18	TAL; 36	CLT; 19	MAR; 34	ATL; 18	CAR; 16	PHO; 10	HOM; 9	23rd	3418	
2003	Robert Yates Racing	38	Ford	DAY; 23	CAR; 9	LVS; 42	ATL; 6	**DAR**; 7	BRI; 21	TEX; 41*	TAL; 3	MAR; 5	CAL; 23	RCH; 37	CLT; 36	DOV; 33	POC; 9	MCH; 17	SON; 22	DAY; 24	CHI; 9	NHA; 27	POC; 14	IND; 42	GLN; 15	MCH; 12	BRI; 38	DAR; 9	RCH; 39	NHA; 8	DOV; 19	**TAL**; 30	KAN; 42	CLT; 43	MAR; 28	ATL; 17	PHO; 20	CAR; 21	HOM; 21	22nd	3525	
2004	Robert Yates Racing	38	Ford	DAY; 7	CAR; 18	LVS; 6	ATL; 29	DAR; 5	BRI; 14	TEX; 1	MAR; 12	TAL; 28	CAL; 22	RCH; 12	CLT; 5	DOV; 18	POC; 12	MCH; 5	SON; 10	DAY; 26	CHI; 21	NHA; 15	POC; 10	IND; 3	GLN; 15	MCH; 32	BRI; 5	CAL; 1	RCH; 17	NHA; 8	DOV; 20	TAL; 22	KAN; 4	CLT; 7	MAR; 32	ATL; 36	PHO; 38	DAR; 23	HOM; 34	9th	6024	
2005	Robert Yates Racing	38	Ford	DAY; 11	CAL; 8	LVS; 29	ATL; 10	**BRI**; 2	MAR; 9	TEX; 28	PHO; 11	TAL; 6	DAR; 20	RCH; 7	CLT; 13	DOV; 10	POC; 21	MCH; 8	SON; 6	DAY; 21	CHI; 37	NHA; 39	POC; 16	**IND**; 32	GLN; 12	MCH; 39	BRI; 13	CAL; 17	RCH; 17	NHA; 30	DOV; 6	**TAL**; 34	KAN; 12	**CLT**; 27*	MAR; 29	ATL; 10	TEX; 9	PHO; 11	HOM; 23	13th	4084	
2006	Robert Yates Racing	38	Ford	DAY; 4	CAL; 23	LVS; 14	ATL; 29	BRI; 13	MAR; 6	TEX; 33	PHO; 37	**TAL**; 16	RCH; 13	DAR; 29	CLT; 30	DOV; 40	POC; 20	MCH; 22	SON; 8	DAY; 6	CHI; 29	NHA; 25	POC; 32	IND; 43	GLN; 7															22nd	3469	
2006	Evernham Motorsports	19	Dodge																							MCH; 10	BRI; 39	CAL; 16	RCH; 13	NHA; 6	DOV; 16	KAN; 40	TAL; 29	CLT; 35	MAR; 38	ATL; 21	TEX; 37	PHO; 17	HOM; 36	22nd	3469	
2007	Evernham Motorsports	19	Dodge	DAY; 6	CAL; 24	LVS; 14	ATL; 18	BRI; 27	MAR; 24	TEX; 17	PHO; 34	TAL; 15	RCH; 27	DAR; 21	CLT; 36	DOV; 26	POC; 21	MCH; 35	SON; 14	NHA; 33	DAY; 33	CHI; 33	IND; 28	POC; 32																25th	3140	
2007	Gillett Evernham Motorsports	19	Dodge																						GLN; 17	MCH; 32	BRI; 29	CAL; 35	RCH; 27	NHA; 38	DOV; 17	KAN; 8	TAL; 24	CLT; 41	MAR; 40	ATL; 14	TEX; 12	PHO; 27	HOM; 38	25th	3140	
2008	Gillett Evernham Motorsports	19	Dodge	DAY; 6	CAL; 24	LVS; 12	ATL; 43	BRI; 19	MAR; 15	TEX; 26	PHO; 41	TAL; 29	RCH; 20	DAR; 42	CLT; 8	DOV; 42	POC; 34	MCH; 9	SON; 19	NHA; 5	DAY; 39	CHI; 12	IND; 4	POC; 27	GLN; 15	MCH; 9	BRI; 32	CAL; 34	RCH; 37	NHA; 24	DOV; 27	KAN; 10	TAL; 10	CLT; 20	MAR; 41	ATL; 25	TEX; 35	PHO; 30	HOM; 28	24th	3364	
2009	Richard Petty Motorsports	19	Dodge	DAY; 5	CAL; 25	LVS; 29	ATL; 20	BRI; 20	MAR; 31	TEX; 32	PHO; 32	TAL; 19	RCH; 25	DAR; 14	CLT; 31	DOV; 27	POC; 25	MCH; 12	SON; 10	NHA; 26	DAY; 10	CHI; 27	IND; 40	POC; 24	GLN; 32	MCH; 25	BRI; 26	ATL; 21	RCH; 34	NHA; 8	DOV; 30	KAN; 20	CAL; 32	CLT; 26	MAR; 21		TEX; 22	PHO; 28	HOM; 41	26th	3350	
2009	Richard Petty Motorsports	19	Ford																																	TAL; 9				26th	3350	
2010	Richard Petty Motorsports	19	Ford	DAY; 24	CAL; 24	LVS; 27	ATL; 19	BRI; 20	MAR; 24	PHO; 31	TEX; 18	TAL; 33	RCH; 38	DAR; 21	DOV; 28	CLT; 21	POC; 31	MCH; 21	SON; 17	NHA; 19	DAY; 22	CHI; 21	IND; 38	POC; 34	GLN; 29	MCH; 9	BRI; 29	ATL; 41	RCH; 27	NHA; 21	DOV; 17	KAN; 28	CAL; 13	CLT; 26	MAR; 28	TAL; 14	**TEX**; 23	PHO; 28	HOM; 28	27th	3234	
2012	Richard Childress Racing	33	Chevy	DAY; 27	PHO	LVS	BRI	CAL	MAR	TEX	KAN	RCH	TAL	DAR	CLT	DOV	POC	MCH	SON	KEN	DAY	NHA	IND	POC	GLN	MCH	BRI	ATL	RCH	CHI	NHA	DOV	TAL	CLT	KAN	MAR	TEX	PHO	HOM	69th	0^{1}	
2013	Joe Gibbs Racing	81	Toyota	DAY	PHO	LVS	BRI	CAL	MAR	TEX	KAN; 40	RCH	TAL; DNQ	DAR	CLT	DOV	POC	MCH	SON	KEN	DAY	NHA	IND	POC	GLN	MCH	BRI	ATL	RCH	CHI	NHA	DOV	KAN	CLT	TAL					56th	0^{1}	
2013	Michael Waltrip Racing	55	Toyota																																	MAR; 25	TEX; 19	PHO; 25	HOM; 14	56th	0^{1}	
2017	Tommy Baldwin Racing	7	Chevy	DAY; 20	ATL	LVS	PHO	CAL	MAR	TEX	BRI	RCH	TAL; 17	KAN	CLT	DOV	POC	MCH	SON	DAY; 21	KEN	NHA	IND	POC	GLN	MCH	BRI	DAR	RCH	CHI	NHA	DOV	CLT	TAL	KAN	MAR	TEX	PHO	HOM	53rd	0^{1}	

===== Daytona 500 =====
Year	Team	Manufacturer	Start	Finish
1999	Wood Brothers Racing	Ford	38	40
2000	Wood Brothers Racing	Ford	40	38
2001	Wood Brothers Racing	Ford	40	18
2002	Wood Brothers Racing	Ford	41	2
2003	Robert Yates Racing	Ford	16	23
2004	Robert Yates Racing	Ford	2	7
2005	Robert Yates Racing	Ford	39	11
2006	Robert Yates Racing	Ford	3	4
2007	Evernham Motorsports	Dodge	30	6
2008	Gillett Evernham Motorsports	Dodge	35	6
2009	Richard Petty Motorsports	Dodge	30	5
2010	Richard Petty Motorsports	Ford	12	24
2012	Richard Childress Racing	Chevrolet	10	27
2017	Tommy Baldwin Racing	Chevrolet	40	20

==== Xfinity Series ====
NASCAR Xfinity Series results
Year	Team	No.	Make	1	2	3	4	5	6	7	8	9	10	11	12	13	14	15	16	17	18	19	20	21	22	23	24	25	26	27	28	29	30	31	32	33	34	35	NXSC	Pts	Ref
1995	Sadler Racing	46	Chevy	DAY	CAR	RCH	ATL	NSV	DAR	BRI	HCY	NHA	NZH	CLT	DOV	MYB	GLN	MLW	TAL	SBO; 8	IRP	MCH	BRI	DAR	RCH; 24	DOV	CLT	CAR	HOM										67th	233	
1996	Sadler Racing	46	Chevy	DAY	CAR	RCH; 13	ATL	NSV	DAR	BRI	HCY; 30	NZH; 40	CLT	DOV	SBO; 32	MYB	GLN	MLW	NHA; 18	TAL	IRP; 19																		35th	1301	
1996	Diamond Ridge Motorsports	29	Chevy																			MCH; 9	BRI; 13	DAR; 32	RCH; 23	DOV; 7	CLT; DNQ	CAR; 36	HOM; 5										35th	1301	
1997	Diamond Ridge Motorsports	29	Chevy	**DAY**; 15	CAR; 5	RCH; 26	ATL; 9	LVS; 30	**DAR**; 29	HCY; 8	TEX; 20	BRI; 14	NSV; 30	TAL; 16	NHA; 34	**NZH**; 1*	CLT; 21	DOV; 12	SBO; 22	GLN; 11	MLW; 2	**MYB**; 1*	GTY; 1	IRP; 2	MCH; 18	BRI; 41	DAR; 9	RCH; 21	DOV; 6	CLT; 14	CAL; 26	CAR; 28	HOM; 15						5th	3534	
1998	Diamond Ridge Motorsports	66	Chevy	DAY; 36	CAR; 6	LVS; 14	NSV; 11	DAR; 5	BRI; 1	**TEX**; 2	HCY; 14	TAL; 41	NHA; 31	NZH; 8	CLT; 41	DOV; 21	RCH; 26	PPR; 19	GLN; 26	MLW; 19	MYB; 10	CAL; 7	SBO; 7	IRP; 2	MCH; 29	BRI; 32	DAR; 13	RCH; 13	DOV; 22	CLT; 23	GTY; 13	CAR; 1	ATL; 37	HOM; 36					8th	3470	
1999	Innovative Motorsports	47	Chevy	DAY	CAR	LVS; 7	ATL; 42	DAR; 35	TEX; 42	NSV; 16	BRI; DNQ	TAL	CAL; 5	NHA; 15	RCH; 35	NZH; 12	CLT; 28	DOV	SBO	GLN	MLW	MYB	PPR	GTY	IRP														36th	1454	
1999	Team Amick Motorsports	35	Chevy																							MCH; 25	BRI; 24	DAR; 24	RCH; 6	DOV	CLT; DNQ	CAR; 23	MEM	PHO	HOM				36th	1454	
2000	Andy Petree Racing	15	Chevy	DAY	CAR	LVS	ATL	DAR	BRI	TEX	NSV	TAL	CAL	RCH	NHA	CLT	DOV	SBO	MYB	GLN	MLW	NZH	PPR	GTY	IRP	MCH	BRI	DAR	RCH; 32	DOV	CLT	CAR; 35	MEM						80th	228	
2000	Andy Petree Racing	51	Chevy																															PHO; 20	HOM				80th	228	
2003	Team Rensi Motorsports	35	Ford	DAY	CAR	LVS	DAR	BRI	TEX	TAL	NSH	CAL	RCH	GTY	NZH	CLT	DOV	NSH	KEN	MLW	DAY	CHI	NHA	PPR	IRP	MCH	BRI	DAR	RCH	DOV	KAN	CLT	MEM	ATL	PHO	CAR	HOM; 36		144th	55	
2005	Yates Racing	90	Ford	DAY	CAL	MXC; 18	LVS; 14	ATL; 8	NSH	BRI	TEX; 5	PHO; 2	TAL	DAR	RCH; 2	CLT; 36	DOV	NSH	KEN	MLW	DAY	CHI; 33	NHA; 4	PPR	GTY	IRP		MCH; 9	BRI	CAL; 13	RCH; 6	DOV	KAN; 42	CLT; 2	MEM	TEX; 9	PHO	HOM; 18	28th	2007	
2005	Yates Racing	08	Ford																								GLN; DNQ												28th	2007	
2006	Yates Racing	90	Ford	DAY; 28	CAL; 32	MXC	LVS	ATL; 30	BRI	TEX	NSH	PHO; 32	TAL	RCH; 18	DAR	CLT; 19	DOV	NSH	KEN	MLW	DAY	CHI; 38	NHA	MAR	GTY	IRP	GLN	MCH	BRI	CAL	RCH	DOV	KAN	CLT	MEM	TEX	PHO	HOM	63rd	550	
2007	Evernham Motorsports	9	Dodge	DAY	CAL	MXC	LVS	ATL	BRI	NSH	TEX	PHO; 14	TAL	RCH	DAR	CLT	DOV	NSH	KEN	MLW	NHA	DAY	CHI	GTY	IRP	CGV	GLN	MCH	BRI	CAL	RCH	DOV	KAN	CLT	MEM				101st	212	
2007	Gillett Evernham Motorsports	9	Dodge																																	TEX; 24	PHO	HOM	101st	212	
2008	Gillett Evernham Motorsports	9	Dodge	DAY	CAL; 27	LVS	ATL	BRI	NSH	TEX	PHO	MXC	TAL	RCH	DAR	CLT	DOV	NSH	KEN	MLW	NHA	DAY	CHI; 21	GTY	IRP	CGV	GLN	MCH	BRI; 21	CAL	RCH; 19	DOV	KAN	CLT	MEM	TEX	PHO	HOM	71st	388	
2009	Braun Racing	10	Toyota	DAY	CAL	LVS	BRI	TEX	NSH	PHO	TAL	RCH	DAR	CLT	DOV	NSH	KEN	MLW	NHA; 18	DAY	CHI	GTY	IRP	IOW	GLN	MCH	BRI	CGV	ATL	RCH	DOV	KAN	CAL	CLT	MEM	TEX	PHO	HOM	126th	109	
2010	JR Motorsports	88	Chevy	DAY	CAL	LVS	BRI	NSH	PHO	TEX	TAL	RCH	DAR	DOV	CLT	NSH	KEN	ROA	NHA; 13	DAY	CHI	GTY	IRP	IOW	GLN	MCH; 7				RCH; 13	DOV; 31	KAN	CAL	CLT	GTY	TEX	PHO	HOM	62nd	649	
2010	Kevin Harvick Inc	33	Chevy																								**BRI**; 3	CGV	ATL										62nd	649	
2011	Kevin Harvick Inc	2	Chevy	DAY; 38	PHO; 12	LVS; 12	BRI; 4	CAL; 5	TEX; 5	**TAL**; 5	NSH; 13	RCH; 4	DAR; 3	DOV; 6	IOW; 5	CLT; 10	CHI; 11	MCH; 8	ROA; 4	DAY; 8*	**KEN**; 5	NHA; 12	NSH; 30	IRP; 16	**IOW**; 3	GLN; 10	CGV; 10	BRI; 8	ATL; 10	RCH; 6	CHI; 6	**DOV**; 14	KAN; 3	CLT; 4	**TEX**; 9	PHO; 27	HOM; 6		2nd	1177	
2012	Richard Childress Racing	2	Chevy	DAY; 3	PHO; 1	**LVS**; 3	BRI; 1	CAL; 9	TEX; 12	RCH; 6	TAL; 10	DAR; 24	**IOW**; 2	CLT; 5	DOV; 7	MCH; 11	ROA; 15	KEN; 9	DAY; 6	NHA; 7	CHI; 1	IND; 15	**IOW**; 1	GLN; 12	CGV; 4	BRI; 5	ATL; 4	RCH; 12	CHI; 8	KEN; 5*	DOV; 4	**CLT**; 3	KAN; 4	TEX; 11	PHO; 22	HOM; 9			2nd	1228	
2013	Joe Gibbs Racing	11	Toyota	DAY; 15	PHO; 5	LVS; 5	BRI; 36	CAL; 7	TEX; 13	RCH; 6	TAL; 11	DAR; 2	CLT; 13	DOV; 28	IOW; 3	MCH; 8	ROA; 9	KEN; 2	DAY; 3	NHA; 18	CHI; 4*	IND; 13	IOW; 8	GLN; 5	MOH; 6	BRI; 10	ATL; 18	RCH; 8	CHI; 19	KEN; 14	DOV; 5	KAN; 10	CLT; 36	TEX; 7	PHO; 8	HOM; 16			4th	1090	
2014	Joe Gibbs Racing	11	Toyota	DAY; 5	PHO; 6	LVS; 13	BRI; 17	**CAL**; 5	TEX; 10	DAR; 2	RCH; 6	TAL; 1*	IOW; 5	CLT; 12	DOV; 9	MCH; 17	ROA; 9	KEN; 10	DAY; 21	NHA; 6	CHI; 10	IND; 15	IOW; 10	GLN; 7	MOH; 7	BRI; 29	ATL; 10	RCH; 8	CHI; 6	KEN; 13	DOV; 5	KAN; 7	CLT; 9	TEX; 9	PHO; 3	HOM; 9			3rd	1154	
2015	Roush Fenway Racing	1	Ford	DAY; 19	ATL; 18	LVS; 13	PHO; 12	CAL; 10	TEX; 11	BRI; 10	RCH; 16	TAL; 7	IOW; 8	CLT; 9	DOV; 21	MCH; 5	CHI; 11	DAY; 2	KEN; 5	NHA; 17	IND; 5	IOW; 8	GLN; 8	MOH; 6	BRI; 31	ROA; 12	DAR; 11	RCH; 24	CHI; 8	KEN; 11	DOV; 9	CLT; 10	KAN; 12	TEX; 10	PHO; 9	HOM; 13			6th	1075	
2016	JR Motorsports	1	Chevy	DAY; 4	ATL; 9	LVS; 8	PHO; 8	CAL; 5	TEX; 7	BRI; 15	RCH; 3	TAL; 1	DOV; 6	CLT; 28	POC; 6	MCH; 5	IOW; 6	DAY; 18	KEN; 6	NHA; 10	IND; 6	IOW; 3	GLN; 6	MOH; 9	BRI; 4	ROA; 8	DAR; 1*	RCH; 4	CHI; 3	KEN; 1	DOV; 7	CLT; 2	KAN; 2	TEX; 6*	PHO; 13	HOM; 3			2nd	4038	
2017	JR Motorsports	1	Chevy	DAY; 24*	ATL; 5	LVS; 8	PHO; 5	CAL; 7	TEX; 10	BRI; 4	RCH; 7	TAL; 2	CLT; 35	DOV; 7	POC; 4	MCH; 3	IOW; 8	DAY; 2	KEN; 12	NHA; 7	**IND**; 4	IOW; 12	GLN; 18	MOH; 6	BRI; 3	ROA; 14	DAR; 33	RCH; 5	CHI; 3	KEN; 6	DOV; 9	CLT; 10	KAN; 7	TEX; 4	PHO; 18	HOM; 8			2nd	4029	
2018	JR Motorsports	1	Chevy	DAY; 2	ATL; 5	LVS; 5	PHO; 9	CAL; 3	TEX; 8	BRI; 4	RCH; 3	TAL; 5	DOV; 2	CLT; 5	POC; 6	MCH; 30	IOW; 28	CHI; 6	DAY; 2	KEN; 12	NHA; 8	**IOW**; 6	GLN; 12	MOH; 6	BRI; 6	ROA; 5	DAR; 5	IND; 35	LVS; 5	RCH; 6	CLT; 14	DOV; 11	KAN; 3	TEX; 8	PHO; 11	HOM; 14			5th	2255	
2019	Kaulig Racing	10	Chevy	DAY	ATL	LVS	PHO	CAL	TEX	BRI	RCH; 12	TAL	DOV	CLT	POC	MCH	IOW	CHI	DAY	KEN	NHA	IOW	GLN	MOH	BRI	ROA	DAR	IND	LVS; 10	RCH	CLT	DOV	KAN	TEX	PHO	HOM			46th	52	

==== Craftsman Truck Series ====
NASCAR Craftsman Truck Series results
Year	Team	No.	Make	1	2	3	4	5	6	7	8	9	10	11	12	13	14	15	16	17	18	19	20	21	22	23	24	25	NCTSC	Pts	Ref
2000	Long Brothers Racing	84	Ford	DAY	HOM	PHO	MMR	MAR	PIR	GTY	MEM	PPR	EVG	TEX	KEN	GLN	MLW	NHA	NZH	MCH	IRP	NSV	CIC	RCH; 29	DOV	TEX	CAL		104th	76	
2001	Long Brothers Racing	84	Ford	DAY	HOM	MMR	MAR	GTY	DAR	PPR	DOV	TEX	MEM	MLW	KAN	KEN	NHA	IRP	NSH	CIC	NZH	RCH; 30	SBO	TEX	LVS	PHO	CAL		107th	73	
2003	Long Brothers Racing	84	Ford	DAY	DAR	MMR	MAR	CLT	DOV	TEX	MEM	MLW	KAN	KEN	GTW	MCH	IRP	NSH	BRI	RCH	NHA	CAL	LVS	SBO	TEX	MAR; 30	PHO	HOM	120th	73	
2010	Kevin Harvick, Inc.	2	Chevy	DAY; 20	ATL	MAR	NSH	KAN	DOV; 24	CLT; 5	TEX	MCH; 9	IOW	GTY	IRP	**POC**; 1*	NSH	DAR	BRI; 26	CHI	KEN	NHA	LVS	MAR	TAL	TEX; 5	PHO	HOM; 13	24th	1061	
2011	Kevin Harvick, Inc.	2	Chevy	DAY; 2	PHO	DAR; 7	MAR						KEN; 6	IOW	NSH; 9	IRP; 24	POC	MCH											88th	0^{1}	
2011	Kevin Harvick, Inc.	21	Chevy					NSH; 18	DOV	CLT	KAN	TEX																	88th	0^{1}	
2011	Joe Denette Motorsports	24	Chevy																**BRI**; 9	ATL	CHI	NHA	KEN	LVS	TAL	MAR; 19	TEX	HOM; 7	88th	0^{1}	
2026	Kaulig Racing	25	Ram	DAY	ATL	STP	DAR	ROC	BRI	TEX	GLN	DOV	CLT	NSH	MCH	COR	LRP	NWS	IRP	RCH; 32	NHA	BRI	KAN	CLT	PHO	TAL	MAR	HOM	85th	5	

=== SMART Modified Tour ===
SMART Modified Tour results
Year	Car owner	No.	Make	1	2	3	4	5	6	7	8	9	10	11	12	13	SMTC	Pts	Ref
2026	Sadler-Stanley Racing	16VA	N/A	FLO	AND	SBO; 5	DOM	HCY	WKS	FCR	CRW	PUL	CAR	ROU	TRI	NWS	48th	36	

^{*} Season still in progress.
^{1} Ineligible for series championship points.

Awards
Preceded by Brad Keselowski; Danica Patrick; Chase Elliott	NASCAR Xfinity Series Most Popular Driver; 2011; 2016; 2017	Succeeded by Danica Patrick; Incumbent
Preceded by Jeff Gordon/Jimmie Johnson	NASCAR EA cover athlete 2007	Succeeded by Tony Stewart
