= Downcast (app) =

Podcast client application

- Original author: Seth McFarland
- Developers: Jamawkinaw Enterprises LLC (Seth McFarland), Tundaware LLC (George Cox)
- Initial release: September 2010; 15 years ago
Stable release
- macOS: 2.9.63 / March 26, 2021; 5 years ago
- iOS: 2.9.63 / March 23, 2021; 5 years ago
- Written in: Objective-C
- Operating system: macOS 10.13.2 or later, iOS 12.4 or later, iPadOS 12.4 or later
- Platform: iPhone; iPad; iPod Touch; Macintosh; Apple Watch; CarPlay
- Available in: English
- Type: Podcast player
- License: Proprietary
- Website: downcast.fm

Downcast is a podcast client application for iOS, macOS, and watchOS. It was originally developed by Seth McFarland of Jamawkinaw Enterprises LLC and is currently being developed and maintained by George Cox of Tundaware LLC.
