= The Dale Jr. Download =

Interview podcast

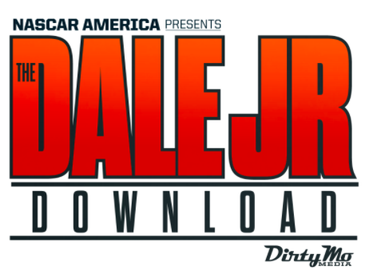
- Genre: Motorsport; Interview
- Format: Audio; video
- Language: English

Cast and voices
- Hosted by: Dale Earnhardt Jr. Mike Davis

Production
- Production: Dirty Mo Media; JR Motorsports
- Length: 30–180 minutes

Technical specifications
- Video format: YouTube; Spotify; Peacock (2022–23); NBCSN (2018–21)
- Audio format: MP3

Publication
- No. of episodes: 862
- Original release: February 18, 2013
- Provider: Apple Podcasts, Spotify, SiriusXM, Amazon Music, iHeart, TuneIn, Player FM, Podbean, Podtail

Related
- Website: www.dirtymomedia.com/dalejrdownload

The Dale Jr. Download is a free audio and video podcast hosted by American motorsports analyst and semi-retired stock car racing driver Dale Earnhardt Jr. It was formerly co-hosted by Mike Davis, JR Motorsports' Director of Communications, who has been a business partner of Earnhardt's since 2003.

== History ==
The podcast was launched in 2013 when Earnhardt and his NASCAR Xfinity Series race team JR Motorsports started an online network called Dirty Mo Radio. The "Mo" is an homage to Earnhardt's hometown of Mooresville, North Carolina. Originally, the podcast was hosted by Davis and North Carolina radio personality Taylor Zarzour, with Earnhardt himself only occasionally making appearances on the show.

Earnhardt's first appearance came on the show's 22nd episode, five months into the podcast's launch. A segment was added to the show in 2014 that played audio Earnhardt had pre-recorded remotely in the immediate hours after a race. His involvement increased once again in 2016 while he was recovering from concussion symptoms, appearing on the show regularly to give updates on his recovery. In 2017, Earnhardt took over as the show's regular host along with Tyler Overstreet. Overstreet served as Earnhardt's road manager until the end of the 2017 season when he moved to Joe Gibbs Racing.

After Overstreet's departure from JR Motorsports, Davis returned to the show in 2018 and became Earnhardt's regular co-host. In 2019, interviews with guests became a regular part of the podcast. Guests on Earnhardt's podcast have included Earnhardt's nephew and Xfinity Series driver Jeffrey Earnhardt, former NASCAR president and current NASCAR vice chairman Mike Helton, current NASCAR president Steve Phelps, Earnhardt's former car owner Rick Hendrick, NHRA champion John Force, 2019 Indianapolis 500 winner Simon Pagenaud, and WWE Hall of Famer Stone Cold Steve Austin.

Davis co-hosted his last show on November 9, 2023. Earnhardt's longtime spotter, T. J. Majors, now serves as his co-host, with Davis overseeing Dirty Mo Media as a whole.

=== Television show ===
In late 2017, NASCAR on NBC announced plans to give Earnhardt his own television show as he joined the network's motorsports coverage. NBC chose to simulcast parts of Earnhardt's podcast, and The Dale Jr. Download debuted on NBCSN as a half-hour television show on June 21. The show expanded to one hour in 2019, formally called NASCAR America Presents The Dale Jr. Download. When NBCSN shut down, the show moved to NBC's Peacock streaming service in 2022.

In 2024, Earnhardt revealed that his contract with NBC Sports expired following the 2023 season, meaning the video version of the podcast would now be uploaded to Dirty Mo Media's YouTube channel rather than streaming on Peacock. Earnhardt eventually moved to TNT Sports and Amazon Prime Video, who began broadcasting the NASCAR Cup Series in 2025.
