= List of podcast clients =

A podcast client, podcatcher, or podcast app, is a computer program or mobile app used to stream or download podcasts, via an RSS or XML feed.

While podcast clients are known for streaming and downloading audio podcasts, many can download video podcasts, newsfeeds, text, and pictures. Some of these podcast clients can also automate the transfer of received audio or video files to a portable media player. Although most include a searchable directory of podcasts (usually populated by either Apple Podcasts or Podcast Index), they also allow users to manually subscribe directly to a podcast RSS feed by providing the URL.

The core concepts behind podcasting were developing since 2000 and the first commercial podcast client software was developed in 2001.

Podcasts were made popular in June 2005, when Apple added podcasts to its iTunes 4.9 software and iPod portable media player. Apple Podcasts is currently included on all Apple devices, such as iPhone, iPad and Mac computers.

== Podcast clients ==
Title	Description	License	Operating system	Ref
Amarok	Music player and podcast client	GPL	FreeBSD, Linux, macOS, Windows	
AntennaPod	Free and open-source podcast manager for Android	GPL	Android	
Apple Podcasts	Podcast software developed by Apple, built into Apple devices	Proprietary	iOS, macOS, tvOS, watchOS, Windows	
Audacy	Broadcast, Internet radio, and podcast platform	Proprietary	Android, iOS, Web	
Audible	Audiobook and podcast app	Proprietary	Android, iOS, macOS, Windows	
Breaker	Social podcast app	Proprietary	iOS	
Castbox	A podcast distribution network and player	Proprietary	Android, iOS, watchOS	
Castamatic	Freemium podcast client for Apple Watch, iPad and iPhone	Proprietary	iOS, watchOS	
Clementine	A cross-platform fork of Amarok	GPL	Linux, macOS, Windows	
CPod	A multi-platform desktop podcast player	Apache	Linux, macOS, Windows	
Deezer	Streaming music and podcast app	Proprietary	Android, iOS, Windows, Web	
doubleTwist	Android music player with podcast directory and podcast support.	Proprietary	Android	
Downcast	Podcast player for iOS, Mac, Apple Watch and CarPlay.	Proprietary	iOS, iPadOS, MacOS, watchOS	
drea	Free podcast app with automatic ad skipping	Proprietary	iOS	
Escapepod	A simple, lightweight minimalistic podcast app	MIT	Android	
Gnome Podcasts	Simple podcast client developed for GNOME desktop environment	GPL	Linux	
Google Podcasts	Podcast app developed by Google; discontinued in summer 2024, functionality incorporated into YouTube Music	Proprietary	Android, iOS, Web	
gPodder	Open source podcast client written in Python using GTK+	GPL	FreeBSD, Linux, macOS, Windows	
Hypercatcher	An interactive podcast app	Proprietary	iOS	
iHeartRadio	Broadcast, podcast and streaming radio platform developed by iHeartMedia	Proprietary	Android, iOS, Web	
Juice	podcast "Media Aggregator" (Note: downloads media files to your computer) client	GPL	macOS, Windows	
Liferea	News aggregator for online news feeds, features podcast support	GPL	FreeBSD, Linux, Solaris	
MediaMonkey	Media organizers with integrated podcast client	Proprietary	Android, Windows	
MusicBee	Music player with integrated podcast client	Proprietary	Windows	
NetNewsWire	An RSS and Atom newsreader	MIT	iOS, macOS	
Overcast	Freemium podcast client for Apple Watch, iPad and iPhone	Proprietary	iOS, watchOS, Web	
Player FM	A podcast discovery and offline player	Proprietary	Android, iOS, watchOS, Web	
Pocket Casts	A cross-platform podcast client	MPL	Android, iOS, macOS, watchOS, Web, Windows	
Podcast Addict	Android podcast, audiobook and radio app	Proprietary	Android	
Podcast Guru	A mobile and web podcast player	Proprietary	Android, iOS, Web	
Poddr	A free desktop podcast player	GPL	Linux, macOS, Windows	
Podfriend	A desktop and browser podcast player	Proprietary	Web, Windows	
PodLP	A free podcast player for flip phones	Proprietary	KaiOS, Cloud Phone	
Podurama	Free podcast player for mobile, desktop and web	Proprietary	Android, iOS, macOS, Windows, Web	
Rhythmbox	Default music management application for GNOME	GPL	Linux	
Spotify	Music streaming service with built in podcast support	GPL	Windows, Mac, Linux, Android, iOS, Web, Playstation, Xbox	
Stitcher	Radio station and podcast client; discontinued August 2023	Proprietary	Android, iOS, Web	
Trebble	A free mobile application podcast client	Proprietary	Android, iOS, Web	
TuneIn	An online radio and podcasts app	Proprietary	Android, iOS, Windows, Web, PlayStation 4, PlayStation 5, Xbox One, Xbox Series X/S	
Up Next	A free open source Podcast Client for iOS	MIT	iOS, watchOS	
VLC	Cross-platform multimedia player and framework, includes podcast functionality	GPL	Linux, macOS, Windows	
Vocal	A podcast client designed for Elementary OS	GPL	Linux	
Winamp	Commercial audio player with free Lite option, supports podcasts	Proprietary	Windows	
YouTube Music	Streaming music app with podcast functionality developed by Google, replaces Google Podcasts.	Proprietary	Android, iOS, Web	

== See also ==
- Comparison of audio player software
