= ESS =

The suffix -ess (plural -esses) appended to English words makes a female form of the word.

ESS or ess may refer to:

== Education ==
- Ernestown Secondary School, in Odessa, Ontario
- European Standard School, in Dhaka, Bangladesh

== Government ==
- Economic System of Socialism, an East German economic policy
- Emergency Social Services, in British Columbia, Canada
- Emergency special session of the United Nations General Assembly (ESS of UNGA), an unscheduled meeting of the general assembly
- Environmental Standards Scotland, in Scotland, United Kingdom
- Ethiopian Statistical Service

== People ==
- Barbara Ess (1948-2021), American photographer
- Brandon Ess (born 1971), German cricketer
- Émile Ess (1932–1990), Swiss rower
- Gene Ess, Japanese-American guitarist

== Science and medicine ==
- Earth system science
- Empty sella syndrome
- Epworth Sleepiness Scale
- European Social Survey
- European Spallation Source, a nuclear research facility
- Euthyroid sick syndrome
- Evolutionarily stable state
- Evolutionarily stable strategy
- Explained sum of squares
- Effective sample size

== Sport ==
- ES Sétif, an Algerian professional football club
- Étoile Sportive du Sahel, a Tunisian football club
- Extreme Sailing Series, a series of sailing regattas
- Eye Safety Systems, one of major manufacturer of tactical eye protection

== Technology ==
- Electronic switching system, an automated telephone exchange
- Emergency stop signal, on automobiles
- Energy storage system
- Environmental Sensor Station
- Environmental stress screening
- ESS Technology, an American multimedia technology manufacturer
- Experimental SAGE Subsector, a prototype Cold War Air Defense Sector

=== Computing ===
- Emacs Speaks Statistics
- Emotion-sensitive software
- Extended Service Set, a wireless networking unit
- IBM Enterprise Storage Server

== Other uses ==
- S, the letter
- Central Siberian Yupik language
- Essex, England
- Essen/Mülheim Airport in Germany
- Employee self-service
- Eurest Support Services, a British food services company
- Eternal Subordination of the Son, theological position
