= Comparison of GPS software =

Comparison of GPS software can mean:

- Comparison of satellite navigation software
- Comparison of free off-line satellite navigation software

== See also ==
- GPS navigation software
