= Eiroforum =

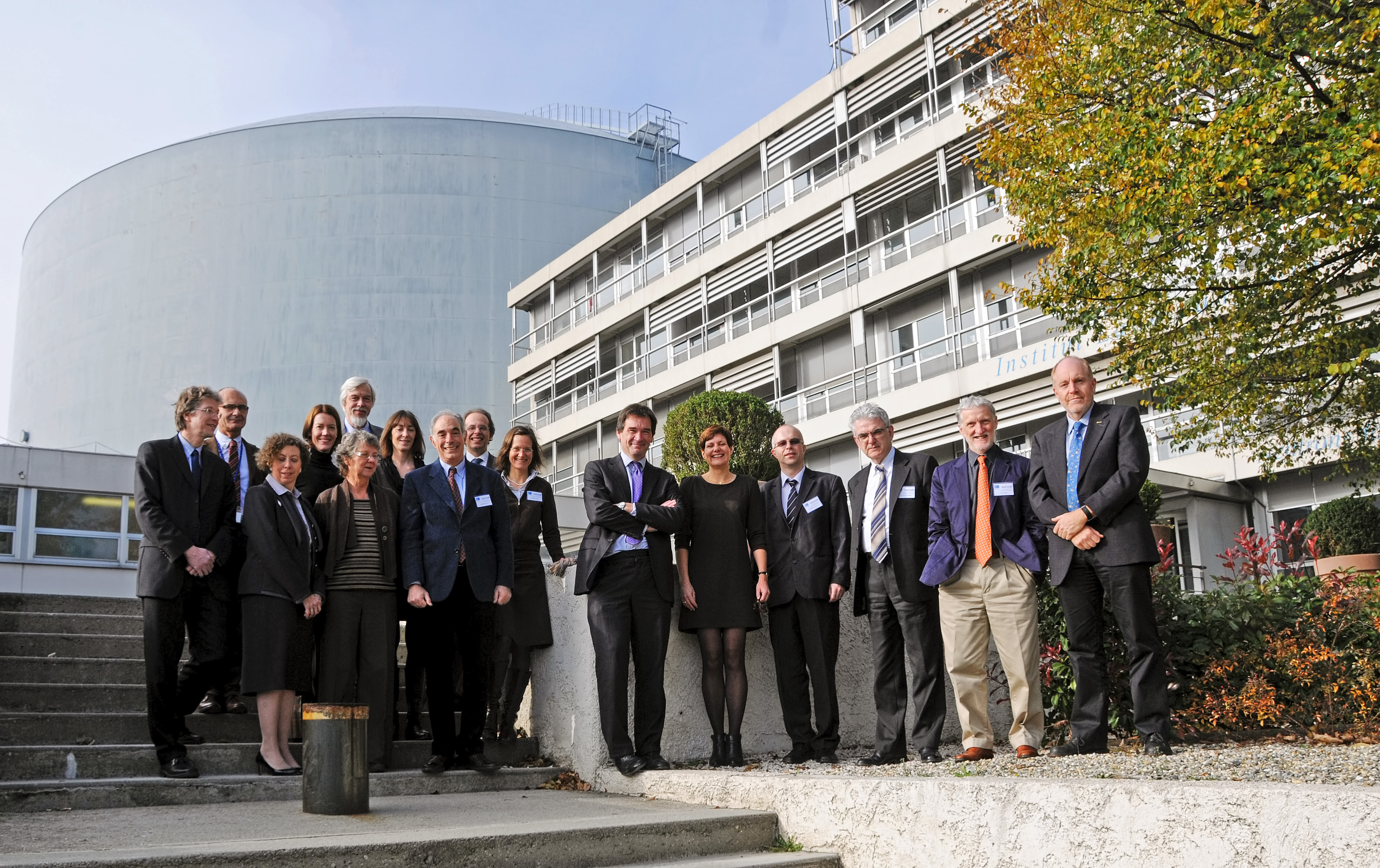
The 2012 EIROforum General Assembly at ILL.

EIROforum (European Intergovernmental Research Organisation forum) is an organization made up of nine European intergovernmental scientific research organizations. The organization aims to identify mutual activities amongst its members to share resources in various fields. EIROforum is overseen through a biannual meeting between the organizations' corresponding Director Generals.

The nine EIROforum members are:

- CERN – European Organization for Nuclear Research
- EUROfusion – European Consortium for the Development of Fusion Energy
- EMBL – European Molecular Biology Laboratory
- ESA – European Space Agency
- ESS – European Spallation Source
- ESO – European Organisation for Astronomical Research in the Southern Hemisphere
- ESRF – European Synchrotron Radiation Facility
- European XFEL – European XFEL Free-Electron Laser Facility
- ILL – Institute Laue-Langevin

== Major activities ==
The EIROforum plays a role in the European Research Area. It works closely both with the European Union and national institutions and actively participates in shaping science policy in Europe. The member organizations engage in a variety of basic research activities and frequently pool together their resources and knowledge bases.

Their five major areas of activity are:

- Science Policy
- Research Collaborations
- Outreach and Education
- Human Resources
- Technology
