= Steven Van Sciver =

American mechanical engineer

Steven W. Van Sciver is an American mechanical engineer, having been John H. Gorrie Professor (1996-1997) at Florida State University.
