= Testware =

Generally speaking, Testware is a sub-set of software with a special purpose, that is, for software testing, especially for software testing automation. Automation testware for example is designed to be executed on automation frameworks. Testware is an umbrella term for all utilities and application software that serve in combination for testing a software package, but not necessarily contribute to operational purposes. As such, testware is not a standing configuration, but merely a working environment for application software or subsets thereof.

It includes artifacts produced during the test process required to plan, design, and execute tests, such as documentation, scripts, inputs, expected results, set-up and clear-up procedures, files, databases, environment, and any additional software or utilities used in testing.

Testware is produced by both verification and validation testing methods. Like software, Testware includes codes and binaries as well as test cases, test plan, test report, etc. Testware should be placed under the control of a configuration management system, saved and faithfully maintained.

Compared to general software, testware is special because it has a different purpose, metrics for quality and users. The different methods should be adopted when you develop testware with what you use to develop general software.

Testware is also referred as test tools in a narrow sense.
