= Comparison of virtual machines =

Comparison of virtual machines may refer to:

- Comparison of platform virtualization software
- Comparison of application virtual machines

In this list platform refers to emulation of an entire physical machine, application refers to the byte code and similar machines used by various programming languages.
