= Player FM =

Podcasting discovery website and mobile application

- Website type: Podcasting and Music streaming
- Headquarters: Los Angeles, {{{location_country}}}
- Owners: As of June 2020 Maple Media LLC, 1880 Century Park East, Suite 1108, Los Angeles, CA, 90067
- Founder: Michael Mahemoff
- Key people: Michael Mahemoff
- Industry: Podcasting
- Website: player.fm
- Launched: November 2011; 14 years ago

Player FM or PlayerFM is a podcast discovery and cataloguing service which lists podcasts hosted across different podcast publishing sites. It was created by software designer Michael Mahemoff in 2011. The service was acquired by Maple Media, a mobile media company, in May 2020 for an undisclosed amount.
