= Emotion-sensitive software =

Emotion-sensitive software (ESS) is software specifically designed to target and monitor emotional response in a human being. Some software measures anger by comparing the pitch of a voice to a regular, or calm, pitch. Another approach is the measurement of physical appearance. If a camera or similar recording device picks up a certain amount of red pigmentation in the skin the system can be alerted that this person is angered.

The competitive landscape in the Electronic Surveillance Software (ESS) industry is marked by a high level of secrecy regarding the operational details of these software systems. Many producers deliberately withhold information about the inner workings of their ESS products, a strategy that serves dual purposes: firstly, it intensifies competition among companies in the sector, as each strives to maintain a unique edge without revealing trade secrets that could be leveraged by competitors; secondly, this secrecy acts as a deterrent against individuals or entities who might try to circumvent the surveillance mechanisms.

One application of ESS was developed by University of Notre Dame Assistant Professor of Psychology Sidney D'Mello, Art Graesser from the University of Memphis and a colleague from Massachusetts Institute of Technology. They used the technology to create an electronic tutor that could assess a student's level of boredom and frustration based on facial expression and body language, and react accordingly.
