= Web mapping =

Types of interactive mapping services

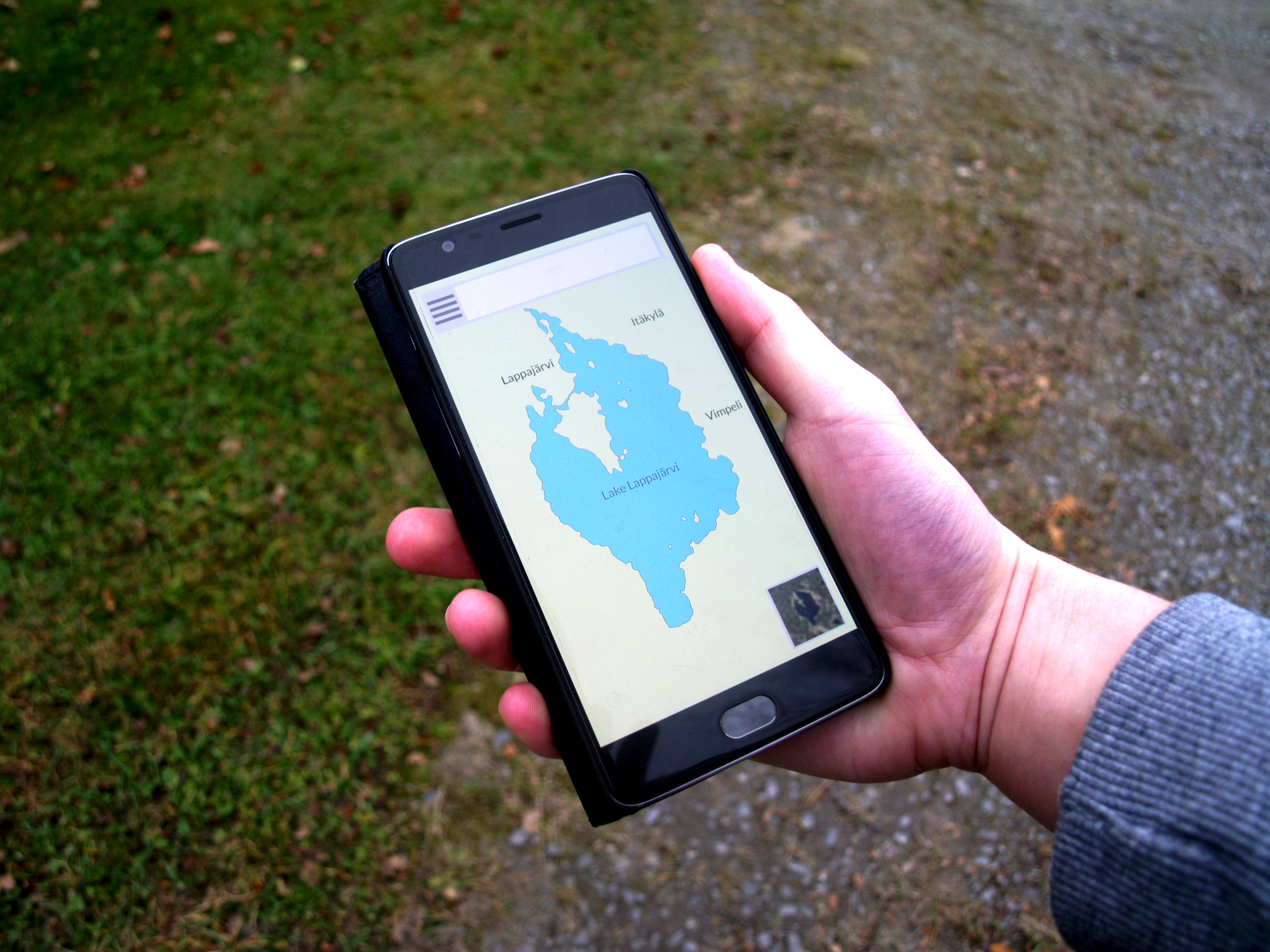
A web map app on a smart phone displaying Lake Lappajärvi in Finland

Web mapping or online mapping is the process of using, creating, and distributing maps on the World Wide Web (the Web), usually through the use of Web geographic information systems (Web GIS). A web map or an online map is both served and consumed, thus, web mapping is more than just web cartography; it is an interactive service where consumers may choose what the map will show.

== Introduction ==
The advent of web mapping can be regarded as a major new trend in cartography. Until recently, cartography was restricted to a few companies, institutes and mapping agencies, requiring relatively expensive and complex hardware and software as well as skilled cartographers and geomatics engineers.

Web mapping has brought many geographical datasets, including free ones generated by OpenStreetMap and proprietary datasets owned by Baidu, Google, HERE, TomTom, and others. A range of free software to generate maps has also been conceived and implemented alongside proprietary tools like ArcGIS. As a result, the barrier to entry for serving maps on the web has been lowered.

The terms web GIS and web mapping are often used interchangeably, but the terms are distinct. Web GIS uses and enables web maps, and end users who are web mapping are gaining analytical capabilities from Web GIS, however Web GIS has more applications than web mapping, and web mapping can be accomplished without Web GIS. Web GIS emphasizes geodata processing aspects more involved with design aspects such as data acquisition and server software architecture such as data storage and algorithms, than it does the end-user reports themselves. The term location-based services refers to web mapping consumer goods and services. Web mapping usually involves a web browser or other user agent capable of client-server interactions. Questions of quality, usability, social benefits, and legal constraints are driving its evolution.

== Types ==
A first classification of web maps has been made by Kraak in 2001. He distinguished static and dynamic web maps and further distinguished interactive and view only web maps. Today there is an increased number of dynamic web maps types, and static web map sources.

=== Analytical web maps ===
Analytical web maps offer GIS analysis. The geodata can be a static provision, or need updates. The borderline between analytical web maps and web GIS is fuzzy. Parts of the analysis can be carried out by the GIS geodata server. As web clients gain capabilities processing is distributed.

=== Animated and realtime ===
Realtime maps show the situation of a phenomenon in close to realtime (only a few seconds or minutes delay). They are usually animated. Data is collected by sensors and the maps are generated or updated at regular intervals or on demand.

Animated maps show changes in the map over time by animating one of the graphical or temporal variables. Technologies enabling client-side display of animated web maps include scalable vector graphics (SVG), Adobe Flash, Java, QuickTime, and others. Web maps with real-time animation include weather maps, traffic congestion maps and vehicle monitoring systems.

CartoDB launched an open source library, Torque, which enables the creation of dynamic animated maps with millions of records. Twitter uses this technology to create maps to reflect how users reacted to news and events worldwide.

=== Collaborative web maps ===
Collaborative maps are a developing potential. In proprietary or open source collaborative software, users collaborate to create and improve the web mapping experience. This type of web mapping is the most popular or familiar amongst the population today. Some collaborative web mapping projects are:

- Google Map Maker
- Here Map Creator
- OpenStreetMap
- WikiMapia
- meta:Maps - a survey of Wikimedia movement web mapping proposals

=== Online atlases ===
Online atlases are collections of maps in a specific period of time like general reference maps, thematic maps, and geographical information. The traditional atlas goes through a remarkably large transition when hosted on the web. Atlases can cease their printed editions or offer printing on demand. Some atlases also offer raw data downloads of the underlying geospatial data sources.

=== Static web maps ===
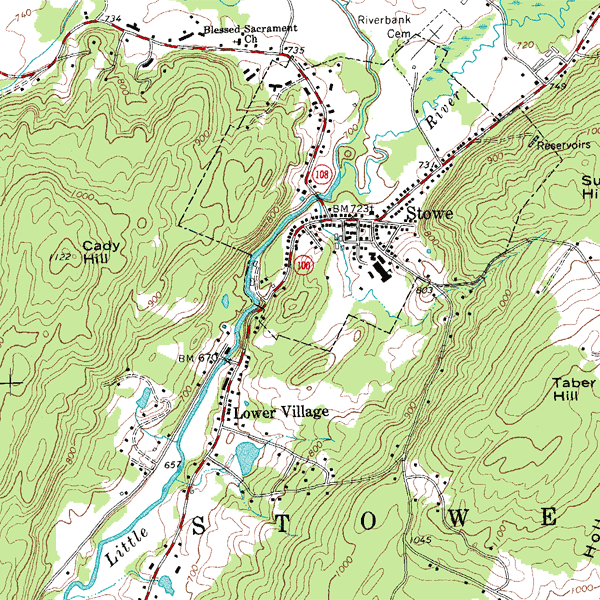
A USGS DRG - a static map

Static web pages are view only without animation or interactivity. These maps were often used before technological advancements allowed the user to interact. These files are created once, often manually, and infrequently updated. Typical graphics formats for static web maps are PNG, JPEG, GIF, or TIFF (e.g., drg) for raster files, SVG, PDF or SWF for vector files. These include scanned paper maps not designed as screen maps. Paper maps have a much higher resolution and information density than typical computer displays of the same physical size, and might be unreadable when displayed on screens at the wrong resolution.

== Web GIS in the cloud ==
Various companies now offer web mapping as a cloud based software as a service. These service providers allow users to create and share maps by uploading data to their servers (cloud storage). The maps are created either by using an in browser editor or writing scripts that leverage the service providers API's.

== Advantages of mapping software ==
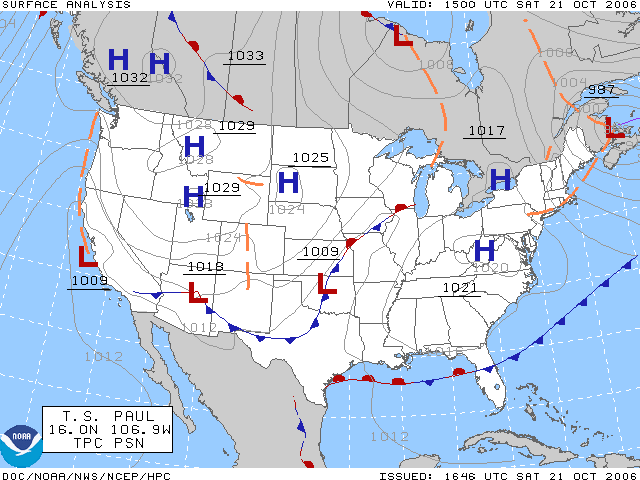
A surface weather analysis for the United States on October 21, 2006

Compared to traditional techniques, mapping software has many advantages. The disadvantages are also stated.

- Web maps can easily deliver up to date information. If maps are generated automatically from databases, they can display information in almost realtime. They do not need to be printed, mastered and distributed. Examples:
  - A map displaying election results, as soon as the election results become available.
  - A traffic congestion map using traffic data collected by sensor networks.
  - A map showing the current locations of mass transit vehicles such as buses or trains, allowing patrons to minimize their waiting time at stops or stations, or be aware of delays in service.
  - Weather maps, such as NEXRAD.
- Software and hardware infrastructure for web maps is cheap. Web server hardware is cheaply available and many open source tools exist for producing web maps. Geodata, on the other hand, is not; satellites and fleets of automobiles use expensive equipment to collect the information on an ongoing basis. Perhaps owing to this, many people are still reluctant to publish geodata, especially in places where geodata are expensive. They fear copyright infringements by other people using their data without proper requests for permission.
- Product updates can easily be distributed. Because web maps distribute both logic and data with each request or loading, product updates can happen every time the web user reloads the application. In traditional cartography, when dealing with printed maps or interactive maps distributed on offline media (CD, DVD, etc.), a map update takes serious efforts, triggering a reprint or remastering as well as a redistribution of the media. With web maps, data and product updates are easier, cheaper, and faster, and occur more often. Perhaps owing to this, many web maps are of poor quality, both in symbolization, content and data accuracy.
- Web maps can combine distributed data sources. Using open standards and documented APIs one can integrate (mash up) different data sources, if the projection system, map scale and data quality match. The use of centralized data sources removes the burden for individual organizations to maintain copies of the same data sets. The downside is that one has to rely on and trust the external data sources. In addition, with detailed information available and the combination of distributed data sources, it is possible to find out and combine a lot of private and personal information of individual persons. Properties and estates of individuals are now accessible through high resolution aerial and satellite images throughout the world to anyone.
- Web maps allow for personalization. By using user profiles, personal filters and personal styling and symbolization, users can configure and design their own maps, if the web mapping systems supports personalization. Accessibility issues can be treated in the same way. If users can store their favourite colors and patterns they can avoid color combinations they cannot easily distinguish (e.g. due to color blindness). Despite this, as with paper, web maps have the problem of limited screen space, but more so. This is in particular a problem for mobile web maps; the equipment carried usually has a very small screen, making it less likely that there is room for personalisation.
- Web maps enable collaborative mapping similar to web mapping technologies such as DHTML/Ajax, SVG, Java, Adobe Flash, etc. enable distributed data acquisition and collaborative efforts. Examples for such projects are the OpenStreetMap project or the Google Earth community. As with other open projects, quality assurance is very important, however, and the reliability of the internet and web server infrastructure is not yet good enough. Especially if a web map relies on external, distributed data sources, the original author often cannot guarantee the availability of the information.
- Web maps support hyperlinking to other information on the web. Just like any other web page or a wiki, web maps can act like an index to other information on the web. Any sensitive area in a map, a label text, etc. can provide hyperlinks to additional information. As an example a map showing public transport options can directly link to the corresponding section in the online train time table. However, development of web maps is complicated enough as it is: Despite the increasing availability of free and commercial tools to create web mapping and web GIS applications, it is still a more complex task to create interactive web maps than to typeset and print images. Many technologies, modules, services and data sources have to be mastered and integrated. The development and debugging environments of a conglomerate of different web technologies is still awkward and uncomfortable.

== History ==
Event types
- Cartography-related events
- Technical events directly related to web mapping
- General technical events
- Events relating to Web standards

This section contains some of the milestones of web mapping, online mapping services and atlases.

- 1989: Birth of the WWW, WWW invented at CERN for the exchange of research documents.
- 1993: Xerox PARC Map Viewer, The first mapserver based on CGI/Perl, allowed reprojection styling and definition of map extent.
- 1994: The National Atlas of Canada, The first version of the National Atlas of Canada was released. Can be regarded as the first online atlas.
- 1995: The Gazetteer for Scotland, The prototype version of the Gazetteer for Scotland was released. The first geographical database with interactive mapping.
- 1995: Tiger Mapping Service, from the U.S. Census Bureau, the first national street-level web map, and the first major web map from the U.S. government.Wikimedia Commons
- 1995: MapGuide, First introduced as Argus MapGuide.
- 1996: Center for Advanced Spatial Technologies Interactive Mapper, Based on CGI/C shell/GRASS would allow the user to select a geographic extent, a raster base layer, and number of vector layers to create personalized map.
- 1996: Mapquest, The first popular online Address Matching and Routing Service with mapping output.
- 1996: MultiMap, The UK-based MultiMap website launched offering online mapping, routing and location based services. Grew into one of the most popular UK web sites.
- 1996: MapGuide, Autodesk acquired Argus Technologies.and introduced Autodesk MapGuide 2.0.

National Atlas of the United States logo

- 1997: US Online National Atlas Initiative, The USGS received the mandate to coordinate and create the online National Atlas of the United States.
- 1997: UMN MapServer 1.0, Developed at the University of Minnesota (UMN) as Part of the NASA ForNet Project. Grew out of the need to deliver remote sensing data across the web for foresters.
- 1998: Terraserver USA, A Web Map Service serving aerial images (mainly b+w) and USGS DRGs was released. One of the first popular WMS. This service is a joint effort of USGS, Microsoft and HP.

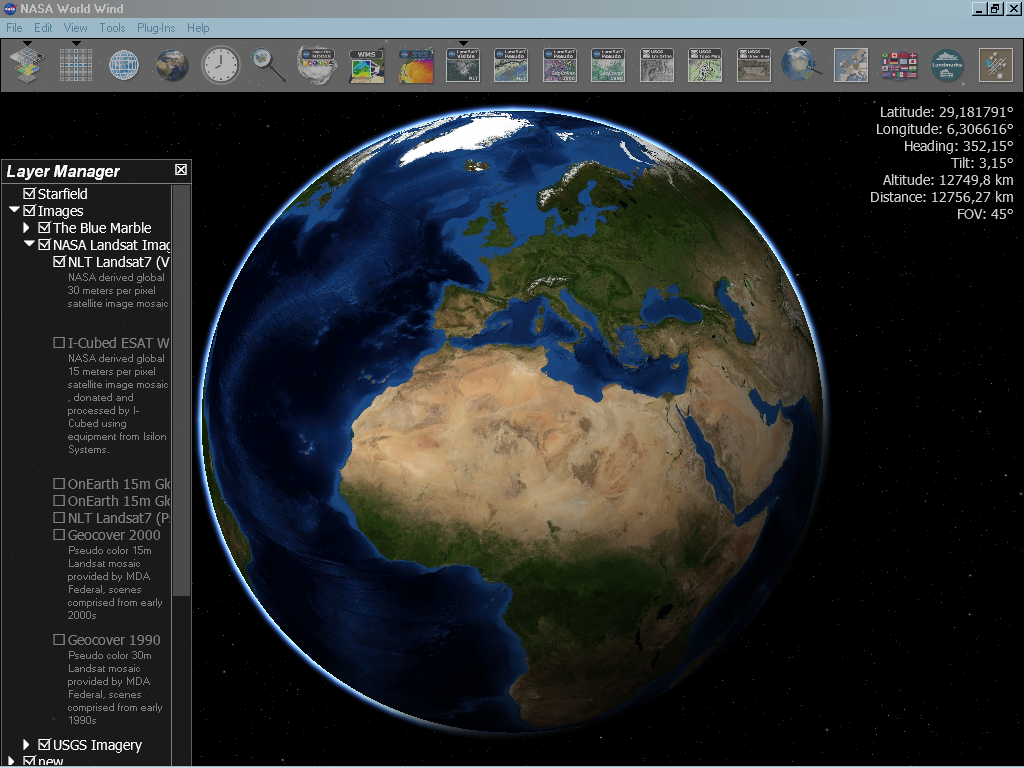
Screenshot from NASA World Wind

- 2003: NASA World Wind, NASA World Wind Released. An open virtual globe that loads data from distributed resources across the internet. Terrain and buildings can be viewed 3 dimensionally. The (XML based) markup language allows users to integrate their own personal content. This virtual globe needs special software and doesn't run in a web browser.
- 2004: OpenStreetMap, an open source, open content world map founded by Steve Coast.
- 2004: Yandex Maps is founded.
- 2005: Google Maps, The first version of Google Maps. Based on raster tiles organized in a quad tree scheme, data loading done with XMLHttpRequests. This mapping application became highly popular on the web, also because it allowed other people to integrate google map services into their own website.
- 2005: Baidu Maps is in beta.
- 2005: MapGuide Open Source introduced as open source by Autodesk
- 2005: Google Earth, The first version of Google Earth was released building on the virtual globe metaphor. Terrain and buildings can be viewed 3 dimensionally. The KML (XML based) markup language allows users to integrate their own personal content. This virtual globe needs special software and doesn't run in a web browser.
- 2005: OpenLayers, the first version of the open source JavaScript library OpenLayers.
- 2006: WikiMapia is launched
- 2009: MapTiler released as open source software for tiling of geographic data for web maps.
- 2009: Nokia made Ovi Maps free on its smartphones.
- 2012: Apple Maps, the first vector-tile based mapping app, is launched, replacing Apple's own Google Maps client as the default mapping app for its platforms.
- 2020: Petal Maps is released.

== Technologies ==
Web mapping technologies require both server-side and client-side applications. The following is a list of technologies utilized in web mapping.

- Spatial databases are usually object relational databases enhanced with geographic data types, methods and properties. They are necessary whenever a web mapping application has to deal with dynamic data (that changes frequently) or with huge amount of geographic data. Spatial databases allow spatial queries, sub selects, reprojections, and geometry manipulations and offer various import and export formats. PostGIS is a prominent example; it is open source. MySQL also implements some spatial features. Oracle Spatial, Microsoft SQL Server (with the spatial extensions), and IBM DB2 are the commercial alternatives. The Open Geospacial Consortium's (OGC) specification "Simple Features" is a standard geometry data model and operator set for spatial databases. Part 2 of the specification defines an implementation using SQL.
- Tiled web maps display rendered maps made up of raster image "tiles".
- Vector tiles are also becoming more popular—Google and Apple have both transitioned to vector tiles. Mapbox.com also offers vector tiles. This new style of web mapping is resolution independent, and also has the advantage of dynamically showing and hiding features depending on the interaction.
- WMS servers generate maps using parameters for user options such as the order of the layers, the styling and symbolization, the extent of the data, the data format, the projection, etc. The OGC standardized these options. Another WMS server standard is the Tile Map Service. Standard image formats include PNG, JPEG, GIF and SVG.

== Impact on society ==
=== Positive Impacts ===
Web maps have become an essential tool for many, as illustrated by a 2021 labor strike demanding (among other things) a certain type of map. Web mapping has allowed for a more environmentally conscious way of navigating location. With the creation of web mapping, people do not have to use paper maps anymore, as it is accessible through the internet, benefiting the environment. Also, atlases or paper maps can become outdated as time passes and the relevant geography changes. With web mapping, users are able to access periodically updated geographical information to get step by step directions to a location based on where they currently are located. Directions provided by web maps can allows be customised based on mode of transportation, with final distances and estimated travel times for each calculated beforehand.

Another benefit is that web mapping has allowed more of the general population to navigate around otherwise brand new areas because it is free and accessible to anyone with an internet connection. Most web maps give real-time updates about traffic and road conditions, allowing drivers to make quicker and safer journeys. Although a niche function, web mapping can be used to learn more about culture and history. Users can explore historical maps, cultural landmarks, natural features, parks, trails, report issues, natural hazards, pollution, and much more.

Web mapping is also used in geography games, notably of which is GeoGuessr. A popular browser based game, users are shown an image from Google Street View and must guess the location. The game was received with success upon its launch in May 2013, and skyrocketed to viral popularity during the COVID-19 pandemic as many content creators streamed themselves playing it.

=== Negative Impacts ===
As much as web mapping has helped simplify our lives, there are also negative social consequences to the use of web mapping. There have been concerns raised about the privacy of personal information while using web mapping. It allows government agencies to create massive databases on individuals and their behaviors while the private sector keeps records of personal information. This issue continues to be challenged and negotiated as web mapping has become more relevant. As the use of web mapping has increased, so has the amount of distractions while driving. Drivers can alter their focus away from the road to their device very easily, which could result in a multitude of negative social consequences and safety concerns.

While there are many benefits to web mapping allowing anyone to access, create, and distribute maps, many have raised ethical concerns. The web facilitates the spread of misinformation, and people without strong understanding of cartography can publish seemingly authoritative products that may mislead the public. This saw significant attention during the COVID-19 pandemic, where the prevalence of improper maps on dashboards contributed to the infodemic.

Web maps require the internet to host, so they are subject to link rot, making information inaccessible. Unlike physical maps, this can have major impacts on the historical record if the web map is the only source for the data it presents.

=== How Web Maps Interact With Human Variation ===
Web mapping allows you to choose a route of travel with provided directions and real time traffic and road condition updates. Of course, this is only possible with an internet connection. Populations that are associated with lower incomes may not have access to a mobile device with internet as they may not be able to afford it, limiting them of this resource.

This technology might also be limiting to certain generations, as well. Younger generations have been cultured in technology for the majority of their lives, so web mapping is an easy resource for them to use. However, older generations tend to be less efficient with technology, as it was not around for the majority of their lifetimes. This can make it difficult for the older generation to understand how to use web mapping when planning their travels. They will often resort to paper maps or a GPS, as that is what is comfortable to them, even though those resources are less efficient and are more outdated than web mapping.

As web mapping has become more advanced, they have added a walking feature. This has created an opportunity for the population who might not have access to and/or afford to have a car. They are still able to take advantage of this technology to get to a destination by foot. Web mapping has also opened up new possibilities to those who might struggle with a vision disorder. More than a quarter of the world's population (about 2.2 billion people) suffer from vision impairment. Web mapping has accommodated this large population by adding a speaking feature. When you enter in a destination on your device, you can turn your volume on and the maps will tell you where to go to reach your destination. This is not only convenient for visually impaired people, but also helps limit distractions while navigating.

== Web mapping barriers ==
There have been concerns raised about the privacy and confidentiality of personal information while using web mapping. Web maps contain personal information such as locations, identities, or attributes of people, places, or things. If not properly secured, your information can be accessed, copied, or manipulated by unauthorised parties. This allows government agencies to create massive databases on individuals and their behaviours while the private sector keeps records of personal information. It can also lead to privacy breaches, data loss, or legal liabilities.

To prevent these issues from happening, mostly in a work setting, you need to encrypt your data, use secure protocols and servers, and apply access control and authentication mechanisms. Another possible barrier created by web mapping that may challenge web map security is data integrity and quality.

Web maps rely entirely on data sources that could potentially be inaccurate, outdated, or corrupted. If the data is not verified and updated regularly, it can affect the reliability of the web maps. Web mapping can also be vulnerable to data tempering, spoofing, or injection attacks, where false or harmful data can be inserted into web maps. There may also be less threatening situations like when web maps may not be updated on a crash or traffic conditions, or may not take you on the most efficient route. To prevent more of these issues from happening, it is important to report unsafe road conditions or any limitations or uncertainties of any web mapping features.

== See also ==
- Online cadastral map
- Comparison of web map services
- Geographic Information Systems (GIS)
- List of online map services
- Neogeography
- Geobrowsing
- Geoweb
- Public Participation GIS (PPGIS)
- Soundmap
- Volunteered Geographic Information (VGI)
