= Gilgit Division =

Administrative division of Pakistan-administered Gilgit-Baltistan

Gilgit Division گلگت ڈویژن
- Region administered by Pakistan as a Division
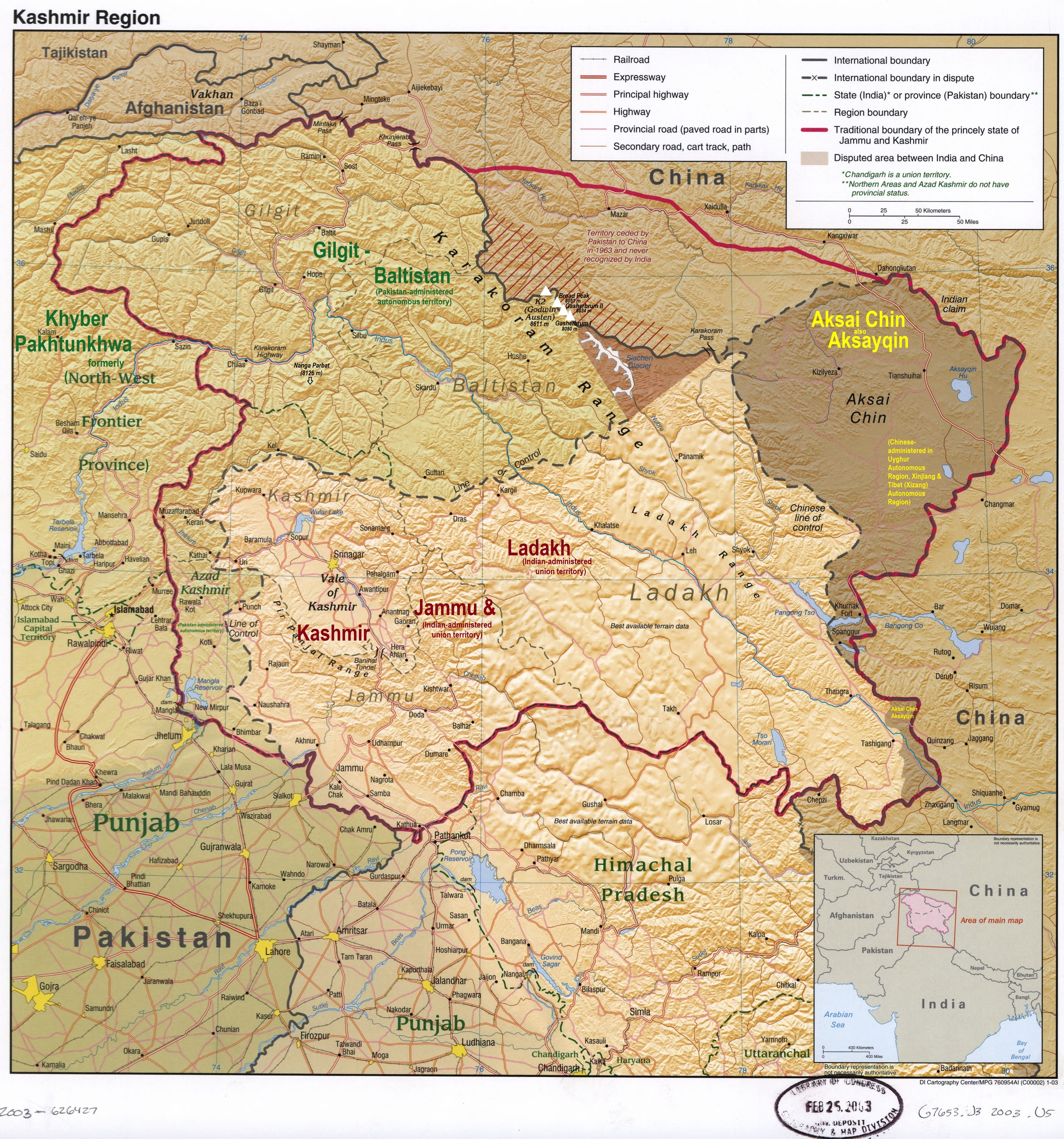
- A map showing Pakistan-administered Gilgit-Baltistan] shaded in sage in the disputed Kashmir region
- Interactive map of Gilgit Division
- Coordinates: 36°19′N 74°17′E
- Administering country: Pakistan
- Territory: Gilgit-Baltistan
- Capital: Gilgit

Government
  - Commissioner: Najeem Alam (PAS)
  - Deputy Inspector General (DIG): Hassan Raza Khan (PSP)

Gilgit Division is an administrative division of Pakistan-administered Gilgit-Baltistan in the disputed Kashmir region. Gilgit is the divisional headquarters of Gilgit Division. Since divisions were restored as an administrative structure in 2008, the division currently consists of five districts.

Following statistics for area and population of the districts of Gilgit Division do not reflect any official records from the government and are based on estimates taken from UNOSAT analysis and WorldPop (2020).

District	Area (km²)	Pop. estimated (2020)	Density (per km²) (2020)
Gilgit District	4,037	132,467	32.81
Hunza District	11,495	50,411	4.38
Nagar District	3,039	92,120	30.31
Ghizer District	4,341	65,245	15.03
Gupis-Yasin District	7,747	95,575	12.34

== See also ==
- Gilgit
