= The AfriPop Project =

AfriPop
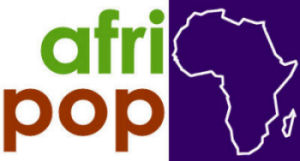
- Logo of the AfriPop Project
- Abbreviation: AfriPop
- Merged into: WorldPop Project in October 2013.
- Formation: 2009-07-01
- Type: International Organization
- Purpose: Producing detailed and freely-available population distribution maps for the whole of Africa.
- Headquarters: Gainesville, Florida
- Location: United States
- Region served: Global
- Official language: English
- Coordinator: Dr. Andrew J Tatem
- Affiliations: Emerging Pathogens Institute, University of Florida

The AfriPop Project was a non-profit project primarily funded by the Fondation Philippe Wiener - Maurice Anspach Foundation that was merged in the WorldPop Project in October 2013. AfriPop was a collaboration between the University of Florida, United States, the Université libre de Bruxelles, Belgium and the Malaria Public Health & Epidemiology Group, Centre for Geographic Medicine, Kenya. The project was led by Dr. Andrew Tatem and Dr. Catherine Linard.

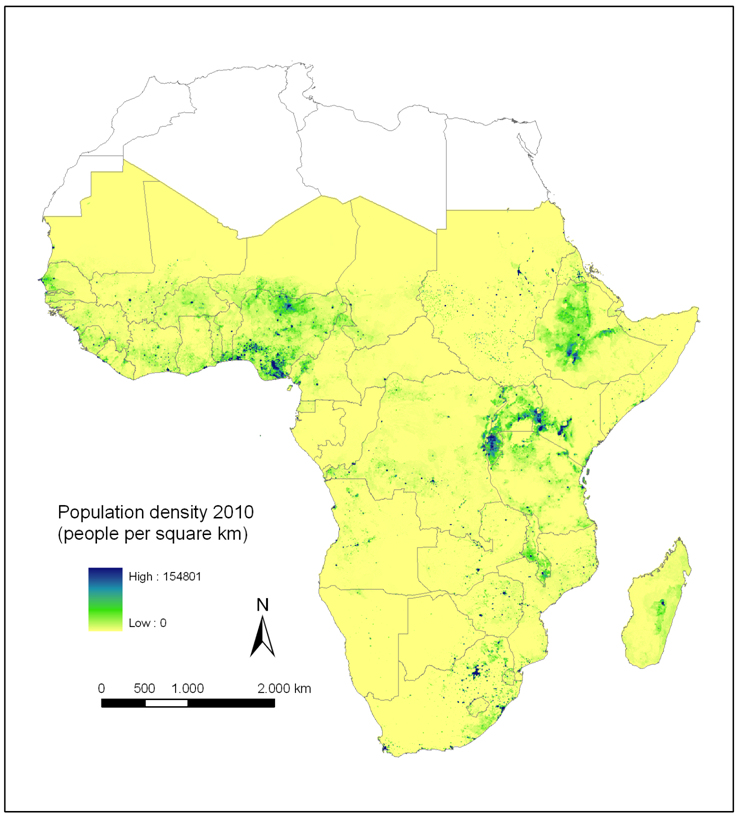
The AfriPop alpha version population distribution dataset.

High resolution, contemporary data on human population distributions are a prerequisite for the accurate measurement of the impacts of population growth, for monitoring changes and for planning interventions. The AfriPop project was initiated in July 2009 with an aim of producing detailed and freely-available population distribution maps for the whole of sub-Saharan Africa.

The AfriPop team assembled a unique spatial database of linked information on contemporary census data across Africa, satellite-imagery derived settlement maps and land cover information. Novel approaches to extracting detailed spatial data on settlements from satellite imagery were combined with contemporary detailed census data and land cover to map population densities across sub-Saharan Africa at unprecedented levels of detail.

== See also ==
Africa, World Population, Malaria Atlas Project
