= Mosquito net =

Fine net used to keep out biting insects

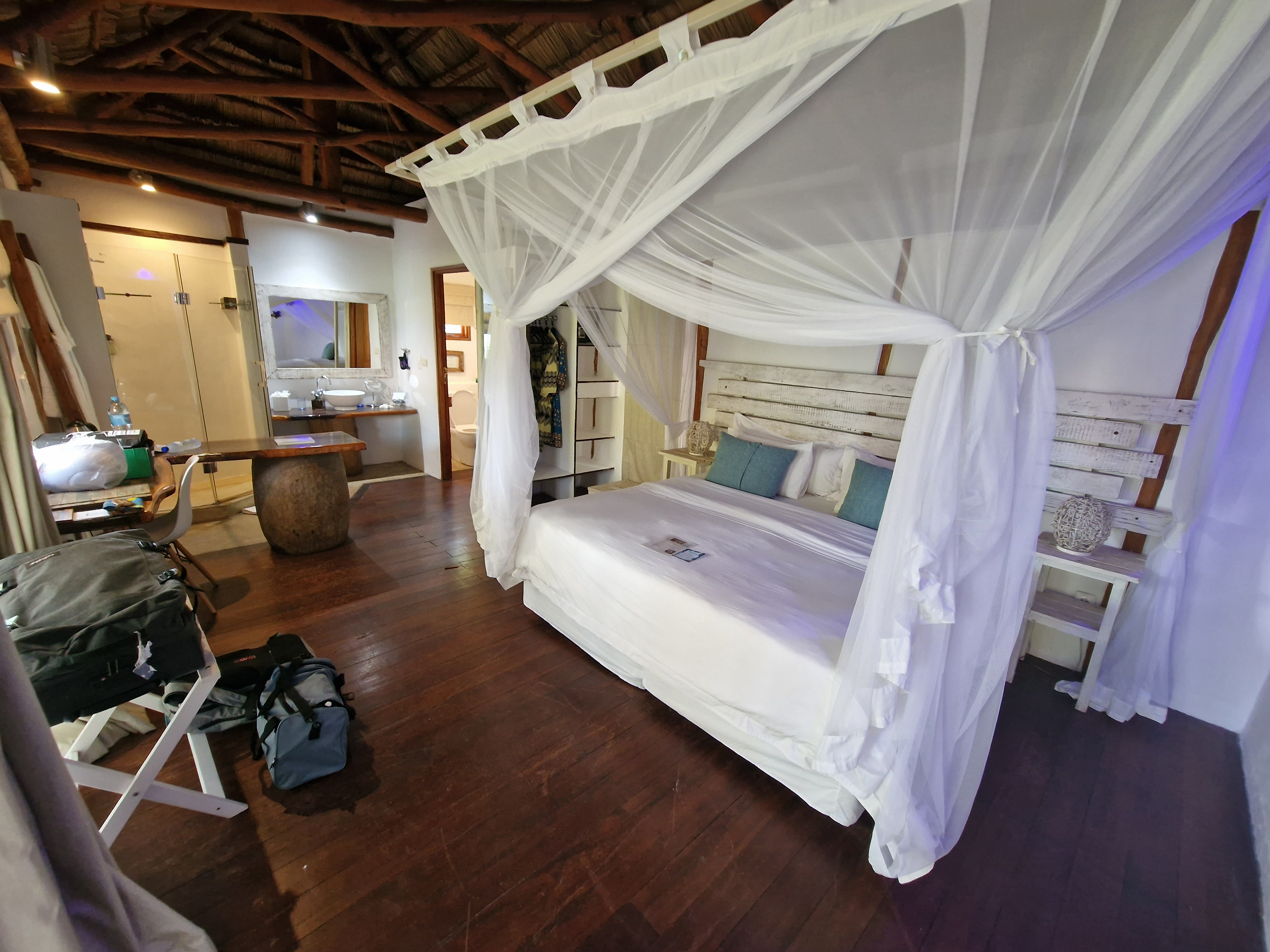
A mosquito net in a beach lodge in Mozambique

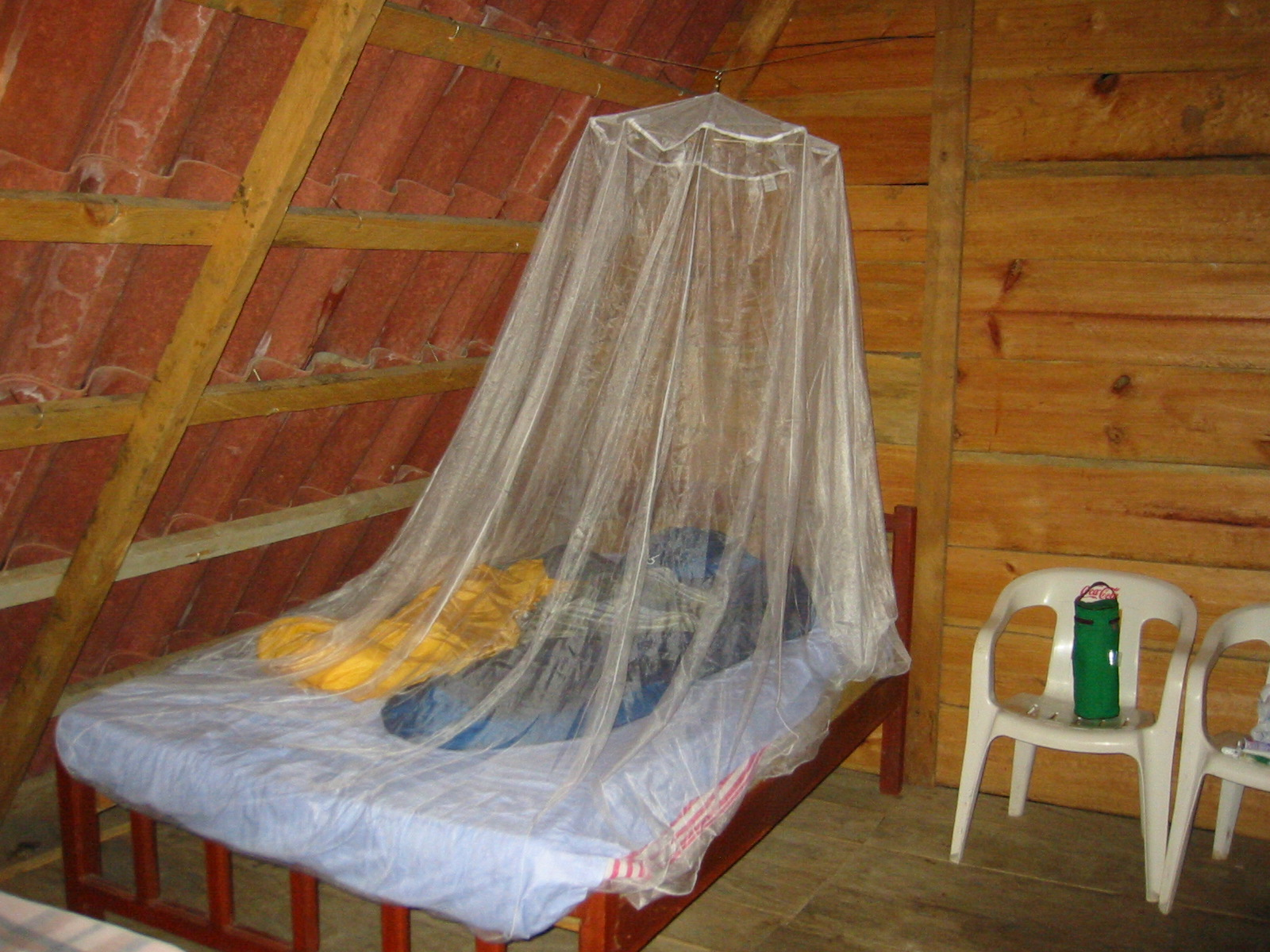
Ceiling-hung mosquito netting

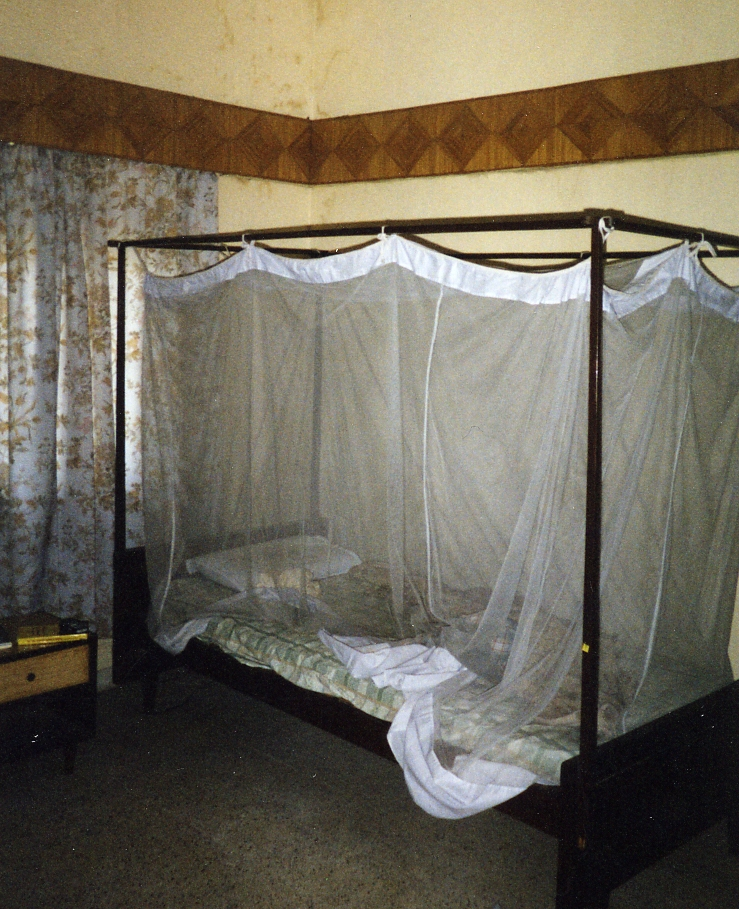
Frame-hung mosquito netting

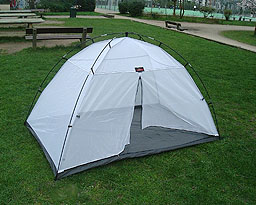
Tent made of mosquito netting

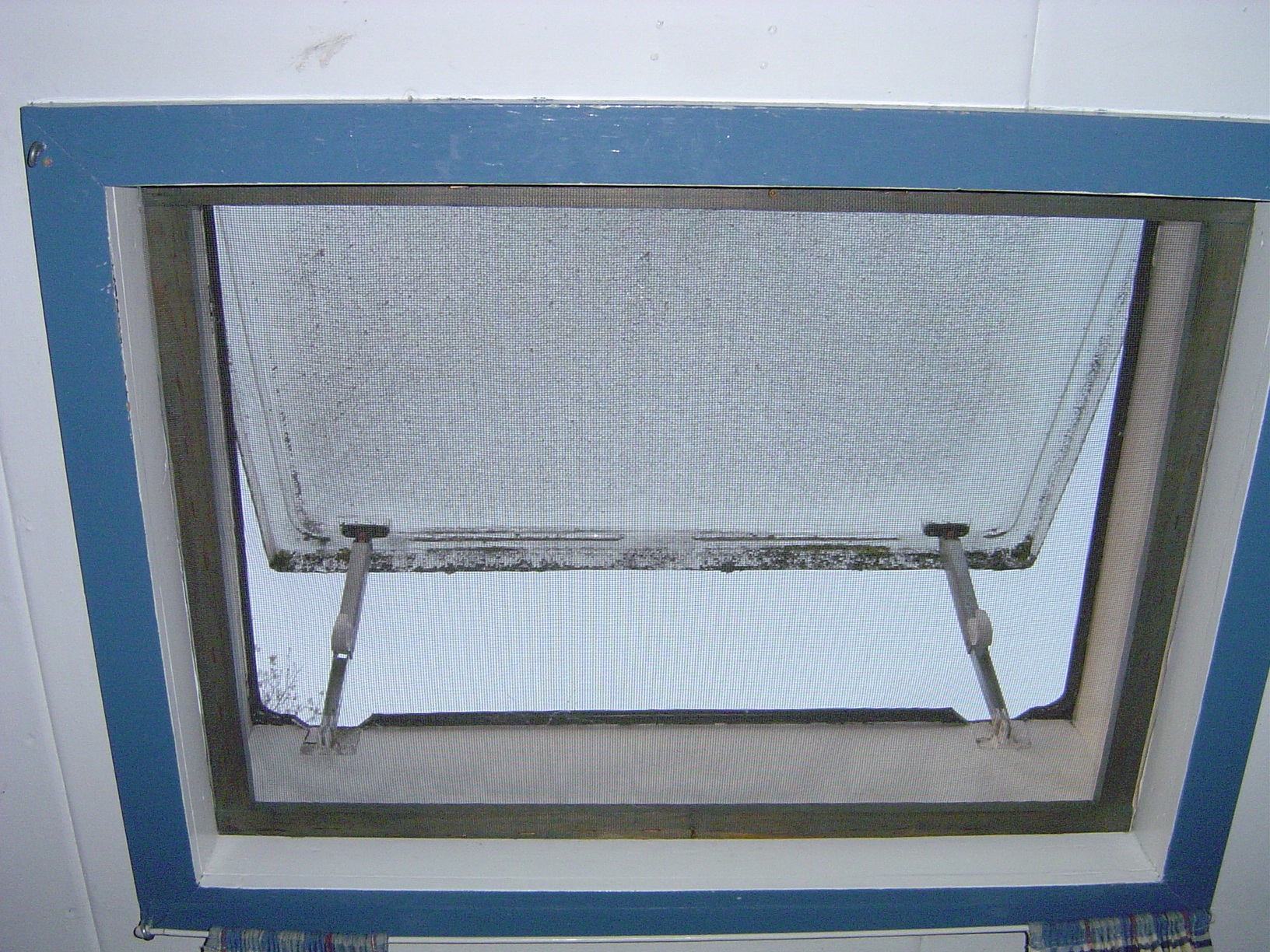
Window with mosquito netting

Mosquito net is a type of meshed curtain or cloth that is circumferentially draped over a bed or a sleeping area to offer the sleeper barrier protection against bites and stings from mosquitos, flies, and other pest insects, and thus against the diseases they may carry. Examples of such preventable insect-borne diseases include malaria, dengue fever, yellow fever, zika virus, Chagas disease, and various forms of encephalitis, including the West Nile virus.

To be effective, the mesh of a mosquito net must be fine enough to exclude such insects without obscuring visibility or ventilation to unacceptable levels. The netting should be made of stiff cotton or synthetic thread to allow the movement of air. A white net allows the user to see mosquitoes against the background. Netting with 285 holes per square inch is ideal because it is very breathable but will prevent even the smallest mosquito from entering. It is possible to increase the effectiveness of a mosquito net greatly by treating it with an appropriate insecticide or insect repellent.

Research has shown mosquito nets to be an extremely effective method of malaria prevention. A 2025 analysis by the Malaria Atlas Project reported that insecticide-treated mosquito nets were responsible for approximately 72% of all malaria cases averted across Africa between 2000 and 2024, an increase from the 68% reported for the period between 2000 and 2015.

== History ==
Mosquito netting is mainly used for the protection against the malaria transmitting vector, Anopheles gambiae. The first record of malaria-like symptoms occurred as early as 2700 BCE from China. The vector for this disease, specifically avian malaria, was not identified until 1897 when Sir Ronald Ross identified mosquitoes as a vector for malaria.

Conopeum or Conopium (Ancient Greek: κωνώπιον or κωνόπιον or κωνωπεῖον) was a mosquito-curtain. It was made to keep away mosquitos and other flying insects. It took its name from κώνωψ, which means mosquito in Greek, and is the origin of the English word canopy. These curtains were especially used in Egypt because of the mosquitoes which infest the Nile. The Scholiast on Juvenal mention that at Rome they were called cubiculare. They are still used in Greece and other countries surrounding the Mediterranean.

Mosquito netting has a long history. Though use of the term dates from the mid-18th century, Indian literature from the late medieval period has references to the usage of mosquito nets in ritual Hindu worship. Poetry composed by Annamayya, the earliest known Telugu musician and poet, references domatera, which means "mosquito net" in Telugu. Use of mosquito nets has been dated to prehistoric times. It is said that Cleopatra, the last active pharaoh of Ancient Egypt, also slept under a mosquito net. Mosquito nets were used during the malaria-plagued construction of the Suez Canal.

== Construction ==
Mosquito netting can be made from cotton, polyethylene, polyester, polypropylene, or nylon. A mesh size of 1.2 millimetres (0.047 in) stops mosquitoes, and smaller, such as 0.6 millimetres (0.024 in), stops other biting insects such as biting midges/no-see-ums.

A mosquito bar is an alternate form of a mosquito net. It is constructed of a fine see-through mesh fabric mounted on and draped over a box-shaped frame. It is designed to fit over an area or item such as a sleeping bag to provide protection from insects. A mosquito bar could be used to protect oneself from mosquitoes and other insects while sleeping in jungle areas. The mesh is woven tightly enough to stop insects from entering but loosely enough to not interfere with ventilation. The frame is usually self-supporting or freestanding although it can be designed to be attached from the top to an alternative support such as tree limbs.

== Usage ==
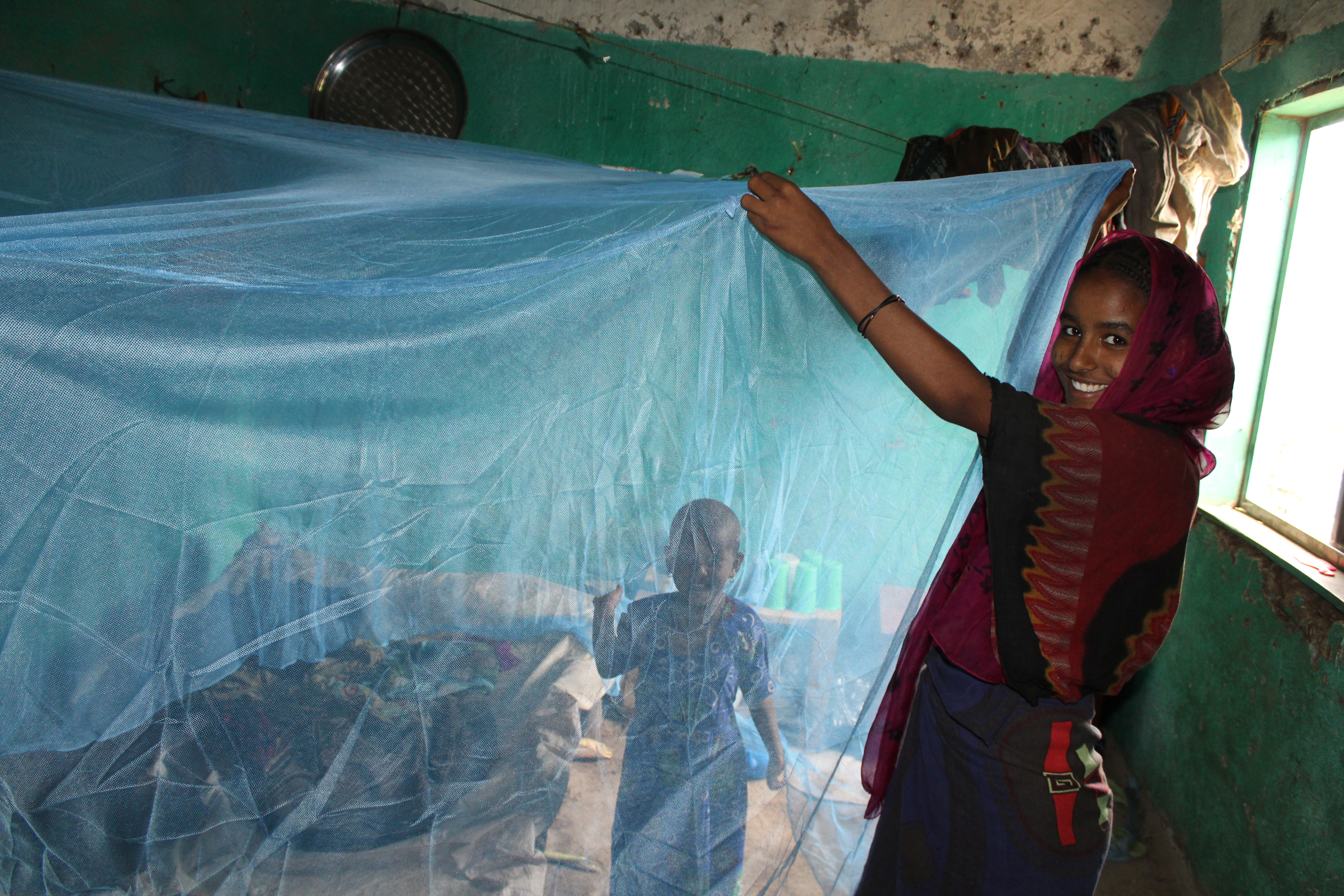
An Ethiopian mother with a mosquito net treated with a long-lasting insecticide.

Mosquito nets are often used where malaria or other insect-borne diseases are common, especially as a tent-like covering over a bed. For effectiveness, it is important that the netting not have holes or gaps large enough to allow insects to enter. It is also important to 'seal' the net properly because mosquitoes are able to 'squeeze' through improperly secured nets. Because an insect can bite a person through the net, the net must not rest directly on the skin.

Mosquito netting can be hung over beds from the ceiling or a frame, built into tents, or installed in windows and doors. When hung over beds, rectangular nets provide more room for sleeping without the danger of netting contacting skin, at which point mosquitoes may bite through untreated netting. Some newer mosquito nets are designed to be both easy to deploy and foldable after use.

Where mosquito nets are freely or cheaply distributed, local residents sometimes opportunistically use them inappropriately, for example as fishing nets. When used for fishing, mosquito nets have harmful ecological consequences because the fine mesh of a mosquito net retains almost all fish, including bycatch such as immature or small fish and fish species that are not suitable for consumption. In addition, insecticides with which the mesh has been treated, such as permethrin, may be harmful to the fish and other aquatic fauna.

== Insecticide-treated nets ==
Children sleeping under treated bednet

Mosquito nets treated with insecticides—known as insecticide-treated nets (ITNs) or bednets—were developed and tested in the 1980s for malaria prevention by P. Carnevale and his team in Bobo-Dioulasso, Burkina Faso. ITNs are estimated to be twice as effective as untreated nets, and offer greater than 70% protection compared with no net. These nets are dip-treated using a synthetic pyrethroid insecticide such as deltamethrin or permethrin which will double the protection over a non-treated net by killing and repelling mosquitoes. For maximum effectiveness, ITNs should be re-impregnated with insecticide every six months. This process poses a significant logistical problem in rural areas. Newer, long-lasting insecticidal nets (LLINs) have now replaced ITNs in most countries and dual agent nets, typically using alpha-cypermethrin and chlorfenapyr, are starting to be used in response to reports of mosquito resistance.

== Effectiveness ==
According to one study comparing methods to prevent malaria between 2000 and 2015 in sub-Saharan Africa, the combined methods prevented approximately 663 million cases, and ITNs in particular prevented about 68 percent of those cases (around 451 million). It is also one of the most cost-effective methods of prevention. These nets can often be obtained for around $2.50–$3.50 (2–3 euros) from the United Nations, the World Health Organization (WHO), and others. ITNs have been shown to be the most cost-effective prevention method against malaria and are part of WHO's Millennium Development Goals (MDGs). Generally LLINs are purchased by donor groups and delivered through in-country distribution networks.

ITNs protect people sleeping under them and simultaneously kill mosquitoes that contact the nets. Some protection is provided to others by this method, including people sleeping in the same room but not under the net. However, mathematical modeling has suggested that disease transmission may be exacerbated after bed nets have lost their insecticidal properties under certain circumstances. Although ITN users are still protected by the physical barrier of the netting, non-users could experience an increased bite rate as mosquitoes are deflected away from the non-lethal bed net users. The modeling suggests that this could increase transmission when the human population density is high or at lower human densities when mosquitoes are more adept at locating their blood meals.

In December 2019 it was reported that West African populations of Anopheles gambiae include mutants with higher levels of sensory appendage protein 2 (a type of chemosensory protein in the legs), which binds to pyrethroids, sequestering them and so preventing them from functioning, thus making the mosquitoes with this mutation more likely to survive contact with bednets.

A 2025 analysis by the Malaria Atlas Project estimated that, across Africa from 2000 to 2024, malaria control interventions averted approximately 1.57 billion cases and 6.2 million deaths, with insecticide-treated mosquito nets responsible for about 72 % of all cases prevented, an increase from the 68 % reported for 2000–2015. The study also noted that progress in malaria control has slowed since around 2015 due to plateauing intervention coverage and increasing insecticide resistance, highlighting the continued importance of effective ITN distribution and innovation in vector control.

=== Distribution ===
While some experts argue that international organizations should distribute ITNs and LLINs to people for free to maximize coverage (since such a policy would reduce price barriers), others insist that cost-sharing between the international organization and recipients would lead to greater use of the net (arguing that people will value a good more if they pay for it). Additionally, proponents of cost-sharing argue that such a policy ensures that nets are efficiently allocated to the people who most need them (or are most vulnerable to infection). Through a "selection effect", they argue, the people who most need the bed nets will choose to purchase them, while those less in need will opt out.

However, a randomized controlled trial study of ITNs uptake among pregnant women in Kenya, conducted by economists Pascaline Dupas and Jessica Cohen, found that cost-sharing does not necessarily increase the usage intensity of ITNs nor does it induce uptake by those most vulnerable to infection, as compared to a policy of free distribution. In some cases, cost-sharing can decrease demand for mosquito nets by erecting a price barrier. Dupas and Cohen's findings support the argument that free distribution of ITNs can be more effective than cost-sharing in increasing coverage and saving lives. In a cost-effectiveness analysis, Dupas and Cohen note that "cost-sharing is at best marginally more cost-effective than free distribution, but free distribution leads to many more lives saved."

The researchers base their conclusions about the cost-effectiveness of free distribution on the proven spillover benefits of increased ITN usage. ITNs protect the individuals or households that use them, and they protect people in the surrounding community in one of two ways.

- First, ITNs kill adult mosquitoes infected with the malaria parasite directly which increases their mortality rate and can therefore decrease the frequency in which a person in the community is bitten by an infected mosquito.
- Second, certain malaria parasites require days to develop in the salivary glands of the vector mosquito. This process can be accelerated or decelerated via weather; more specifically heat. Plasmodium falciparum, for example, the parasite that is responsible for the majority of deaths in Sub-Saharan Africa, takes eight days to mature. Therefore, malaria transmission to humans does not take place until approximately the tenth day, although it requires blood meals at intervals of two to five days. By killing mosquitoes before maturation of the malaria parasite, ITNs can reduce the number of encounters of infected mosquitoes with humans.

When a large number of nets are distributed in one residential area, their chemical additives help reduce the number of mosquitoes in the environment. With fewer mosquitoes, the chances of malaria infection for recipients and non-recipients are significantly reduced. (In other words, the importance of the physical barrier effect of ITNs decreases relative to the positive externality effect of the nets in creating a mosquito-free environment when ITNs are highly concentrated in one residential cluster or community.)

Standard ITNs must be replaced or re-treated with insecticide after six washes and, therefore, are not seen as a convenient, effective long-term solution to the malaria problem.

As a result, the mosquito netting and pesticide industries developed so-called long-lasting insecticidal mosquito nets, which also use pyrethroid insecticides. There are three types of LLINs — polyester netting which has insecticide bound to the external surface of the netting fibre using a resin; polyethylene which has insecticide incorporated into the fibre and polypropylene which has insecticide incorporated into the fibre. All types can be washed at least 20 times, but physical durability will vary. A survey carried out in Tanzania concluded that effective life of polyester nets was 2 to 3 years; with polyethylene LLINs there are data to support over 5 years of life with trials in showing nets which were still effective after 7 years.

=== Scientific trials ===
A review of 22 randomized controlled trials of ITNs found (for Plasmodium falciparum malaria) that ITNs can reduce deaths in children by one fifth and episodes of malaria by half.

More specifically, in areas of stable malaria "ITNs reduced the incidence of uncomplicated malarial episodes by 50% compared to no nets, and 39% compared to untreated nets" and in areas of unstable malaria "by 62% compared to no nets and 43% compared to untreated nets". As such the review calculated that for every 1000 children protected by ITNs, 5.5 lives would be saved each year.

Through the years 1999 and 2010 the abundance of female anopheles gambiae densities in houses throughout western Kenya were recorded. This data set was paired with the spatial data of bed net usage in order to determine correlation. Results showed that from 2008 to 2010 the relative population density of the female anopheles gambiae decreased from 90.6% to 60.7%. The conclusion of this study showed that as the number of houses which used insecticide treated bed nets increased the population density of female anopheles gambiae decreased. This result did however vary from region to region based on the local environment.

A 2019 study in PLoS ONE found that a campaign to distribute mosquito bednets in the Democratic Republic of Congo led to a 41% decline mortality for children under five who lived in areas with a high malaria risk.

== Associated problems ==
Malaria potentially contributes to poverty and vice versa. The poorest people affected by malaria may not be able to afford simple malaria prevention measures such as mosquito nets unless they are provided for free.

Mosquito nets have been observed to be used in fisheries across the world, where their strength, light weight and free or cheap accessibility make them an attractive tool for fishing. People who use them for fishing catch vast numbers of juvenile fish.

== Alternatives ==
Mosquito nets do reduce air flow to an extent and sleeping under a net is hotter than sleeping without one, which can be uncomfortable in tropical areas without air-conditioning.

Some alternatives are:

- The use of a fan to increase air flow.
- The application of an insect repellent to the skin; this also may be less effective (reducing rather than eliminating bites), more expensive, and may pose health risks with long-term use.
- The use of indoor residual spraying of insecticides. This was a common practice in the late-20th Century. However, due to an increased awareness of the environmental hazards associated with the insecticide DDT used for some of these programs, this practice became less common. For example - American funding for African programs were cut and the number of malaria-infected subjects skyrocketed. In order to see results from the use of indoor residual spraying programs 80% of homes in the affected area need to be sprayed and the application of insecticide needs to be constant in order to suppress certain species which are immune to the insecticide. Large-scale application results in a dependence on continual spraying. If the aggressive style of application is not maintained then the risk of an increase of genetically-resistant mosquitos increases. This would ultimately result in an unrealistic mediation process.

== See also ==
- Against Malaria Foundation
- Canopy bed
- Four-poster bed
- Malaria Consortium
- Malaria prophylaxis
- Mosquito control
- Screened porch
- Spread the Net
- United to Beat Malaria
