= WorldPop Project =

Research programme

WorldPop
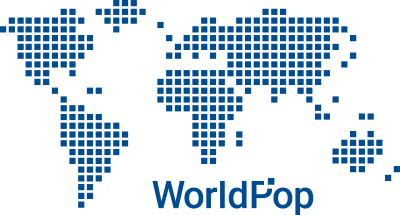
- Logo of the WorldPop Project
- Abbreviation: WorldPop
- Formation: 2013-10-01
- Type: Research project
- Headquarters: University of Southampton Southampton, Hampshire
- Location: United Kingdom
- Region served: Global
- Official language: English
- Coordinator: Professor Andrew J Tatem
- Affiliations: School of Geography and Environmental Science, University of Southampton
- Website: http://www.worldpop.org/

WorldPop is a research programme based in the School of Geography and Environmental Science, University of Southampton. The programme employs a multidisciplinary team of researchers, analysts, GIS technicians, and project specialists who construct open data on populations and population attributes at high spatial resolution. Created from a combination of The AfriPop Project, AmeriPop, and AsiaPop projects in 2013, WorldPop engages in geospatial demographic projects with governments and institutions in low- and middle-income countries (LMICs) as well as collaborations with partner organisations, such as the Bill & Melinda Gates Foundation, Gavi, the Vaccine Alliance, United Nations agencies, the UK Foreign, Commonwealth and Development Office, commercial data providers and other international development organisations. The programme provides training in population modelling to ministries of health and national statistical offices in LMICs and works with them to support health and demographic surveys to achieve Sustainable Development Goals

== Areas of interest ==
- Demography
- Geographic information system data
- Satellite imagery
- Remote sensing
- Effects of Non-pharmaceutical intervention (epidemiology) on COVID-19
- Geospatial predictive modeling

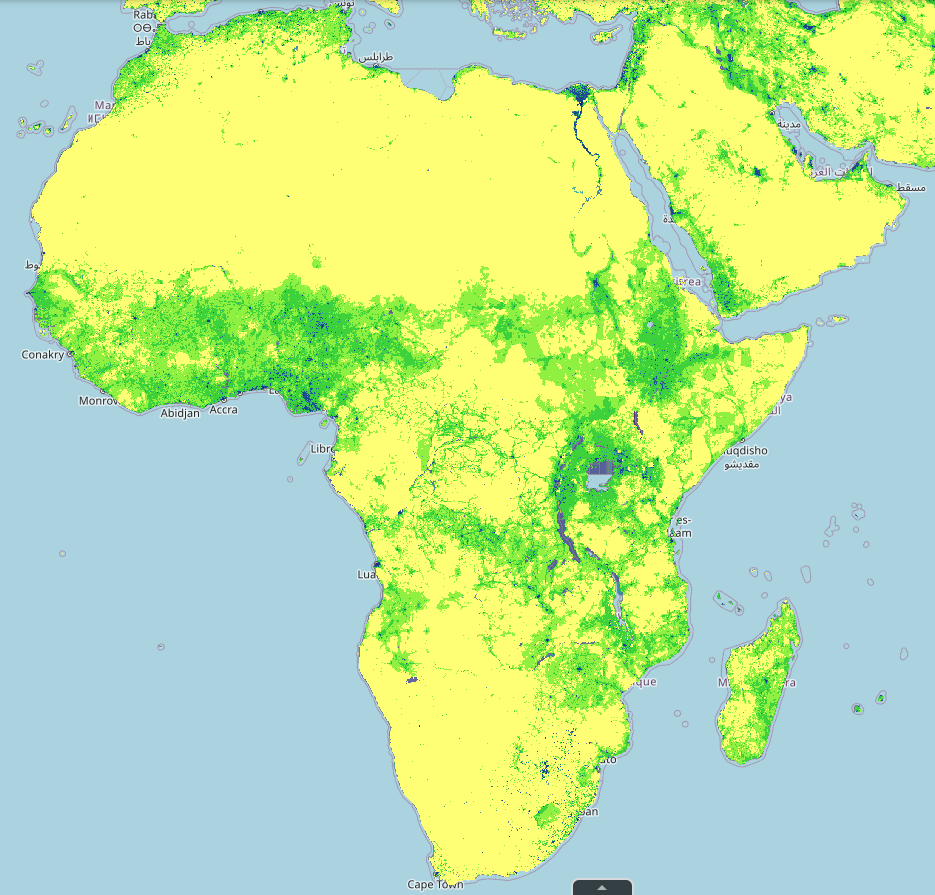
Screen capture of WorldPop Demographics Portal interface showing subnational age/sex structures for Africa, 2020

== Population estimation ==
WorldPop develops statistical population modelling methods to produce gridded population estimates that support census activities. The programme develops new methods for data synthesis that use demographic and health surveys, census, satellite imagery, cell phone and other data to create consistent gridded outputs and map detailed population densities.

A case study evaluating several geospatial datasets against the 'gold-standard' census data for Bioko Island, Equatorial Guinea found that while the WorldPop Constrained dataset for the area matched best at lower population densities, WorldPop Unconstrained data performed poorly at all densities.

=== Population of Papua New Guinea ===
Although the government of Papua New Guinea had estimated the country's population at 9.4 million, unpublished findings of a population estimation study funded by the United Nations Population Fund and conducted by WorldPop in November 2022 suggested the true population was close to 17 million. This estimate was reviewed and amended to less than 11 million and the methodology used to calculate this figure was published in July 2023.

== Academic debate on rural population estimates ==
In 2025, the accuracy of WorldPop and other global gridded population datasets was discussed in the academic literature with respect to the representation of rural populations. The debate centred on whether observed discrepancies indicate a systemic bias in population modelling or reflect localised methodological limitations.

=== Rural underrepresentation study (2025) ===
A study published in Nature Communications by Láng-Ritter et al. (2025) analysed five major global population datasets, including WorldPop, and reported systematic underestimation of rural populations. Using historical resettlement records from 307 large dam projects across 35 countries as an independent reference, the authors estimated a 53.4% negative bias in WorldPop’s rural population estimates. The study attributed this discrepancy to incomplete rural census data and modelling approaches primarily calibrated for urban environments, and suggested potential implications for development planning and resource allocation.

=== Response from data producers ===
In a published rebuttal, a group of population data producers, including WorldPop Director Andrew J. Tatem, disputed the study’s conclusions and argued that its findings resulted from methodological shortcomings rather than systemic bias. The rebuttal raised several points:

- The study was said to measure known technical limitations, such as the use of static water masks and growth-only building models, in areas affected by reservoir flooding where population allocation is not intended.
- The authors argued that displacement linked to large dam reservoirs represents rare and localised cases that should not be generalised to global rural population accuracy.
- They stated that population in such areas is typically redistributed to nearby grid cells rather than omitted from datasets.
- The rebuttal estimated that reservoir-related population misplacement affects less than 2% of the global rural population, contrasting with the larger global underestimation proposed by Láng-Ritter et al..

The data producers acknowledged the value of improving rural demographic data but maintained that the study does not demonstrate a fundamental flaw in WorldPop or other global gridded population datasets.

== WorldPop Database ==
Outputs from WorldPop research contribute to a spatial database of linked information on contemporary census data, satellite-imagery-derived settlement maps, and land cover information. The resultant API, datasets, methods, and maps are available under Creative Commons license on the project's websites. Through collaboration with Esri, gridded population datasets produced by WorldPop are also available in the ArcGIS Living Atlas of the World

== See also ==
- Developing country
- World Population
- Malaria Atlas Project
