= Web data services =

Web data services refers to service-oriented architecture (SOA) applied to data sourced from the World Wide Web and the Internet as a whole. Web data services enable maximal mashup, reuse, and sharing of structured data (such as relational tables), semi-structured information (such as Extensible Markup Language (XML) documents), and unstructured information (such as RSS feeds, content from Web applications, commercial data from online business sources).

In a Web data services environment, applications may subscribe to and consume information, provide and publish information for others to consume, or both. Applications that can serve as a consumer-subscriber and/or provider-publisher of Web data services include mobile computing, Web portals, enterprise portals, online business software, social media, and social networks. Web data services may support business-to-consumer (B2C) and business-to-business (B2B) information-sharing requirements. Increasingly, enterprises are including Web data services in their SOA implementations, as they integrate mashup-style user-driven information sharing into business intelligence, business process management, predictive analytics, content management, and other applications, according to industry analysts.

To speed development of Web data services, enterprises can deploy technologies that ease discovery, extraction, movement, transformation, cleansing, normalization, joining, consolidation, access, and presentation of disparate information types from diverse internal sources (such as data warehouses and customer relationship management (CRM) systems) and external sources (such as commercial market data aggregators). Web data services build on industry-standard protocols, interfaces, formats, and integration patterns, such as those used for SOA, Web 2.0, Web-Oriented Architecture, and Representational State Transfer (REST). In addition to operating over the public Internet, Web data services may run solely within corporate intranets, or across B2B supply chains, or even span hosted software-as-a-service (SaaS) or Cloud computing environments.

== See also ==
- Data Integration
- Data Virtualization
- Web data integration
