= Traffic congestion map =

Visualisation of traffic flow

A traffic congestion map is a graphical, realtime or near-realtime representation of traffic flow for some particular area. Data is typically collected via anonymous GPS datapoints and loop sensors embedded in the roadways, then processed by computer at a central facility and distributed as a map view to users.

Many web sites, news channels and mobile apps show these maps to help commuters avoid congested areas. Sometimes they are displayed directly to motorists using electronic signs, such as those on the 2nd Ring Road in Beijing. Frequently these show conditions on highways, but local streets can also be shown.
