= National Atlas of the United States =

Atlas published by the United States Department of the Interior from 1874-1997

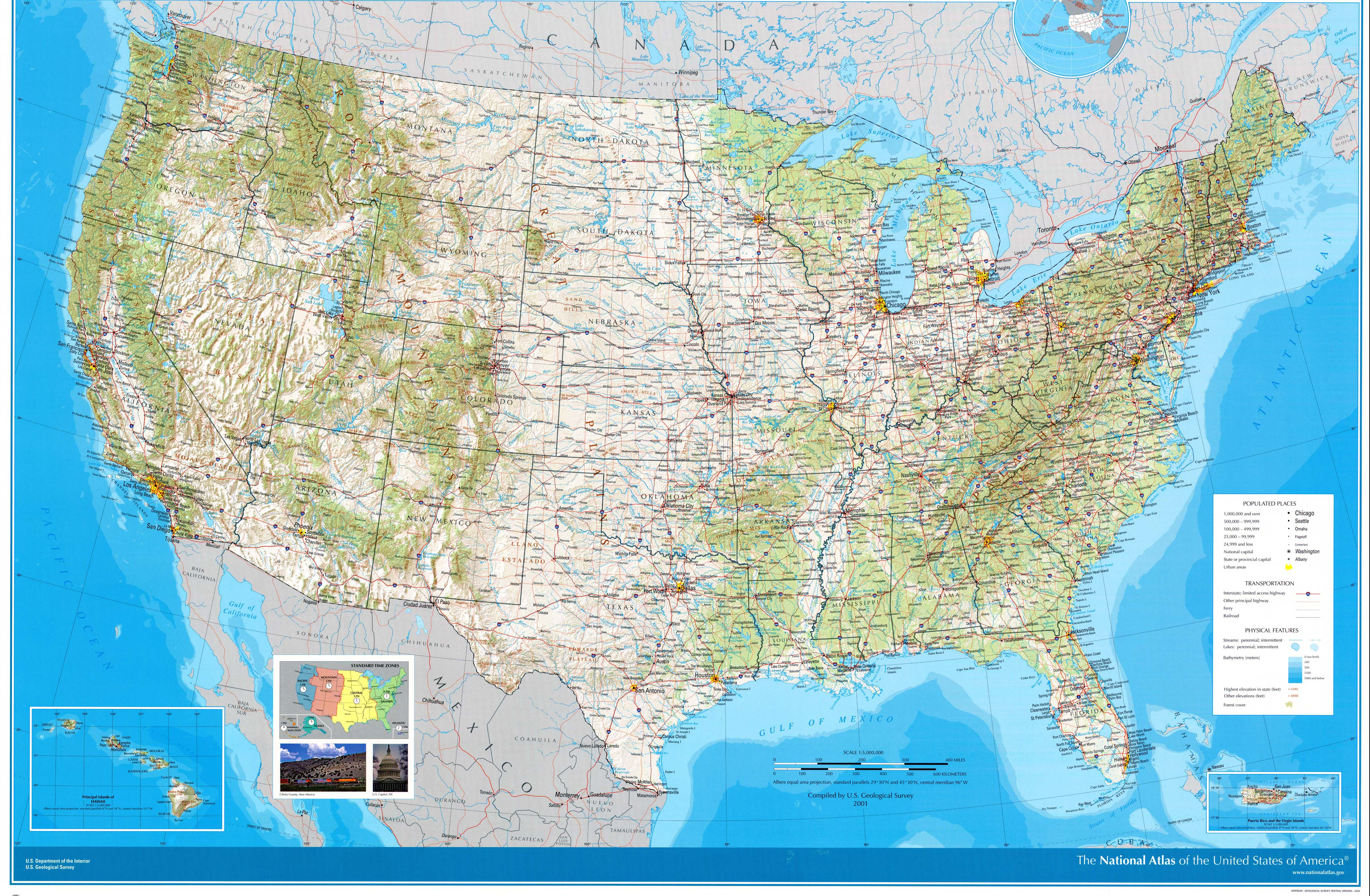
A National Atlas map from 2002

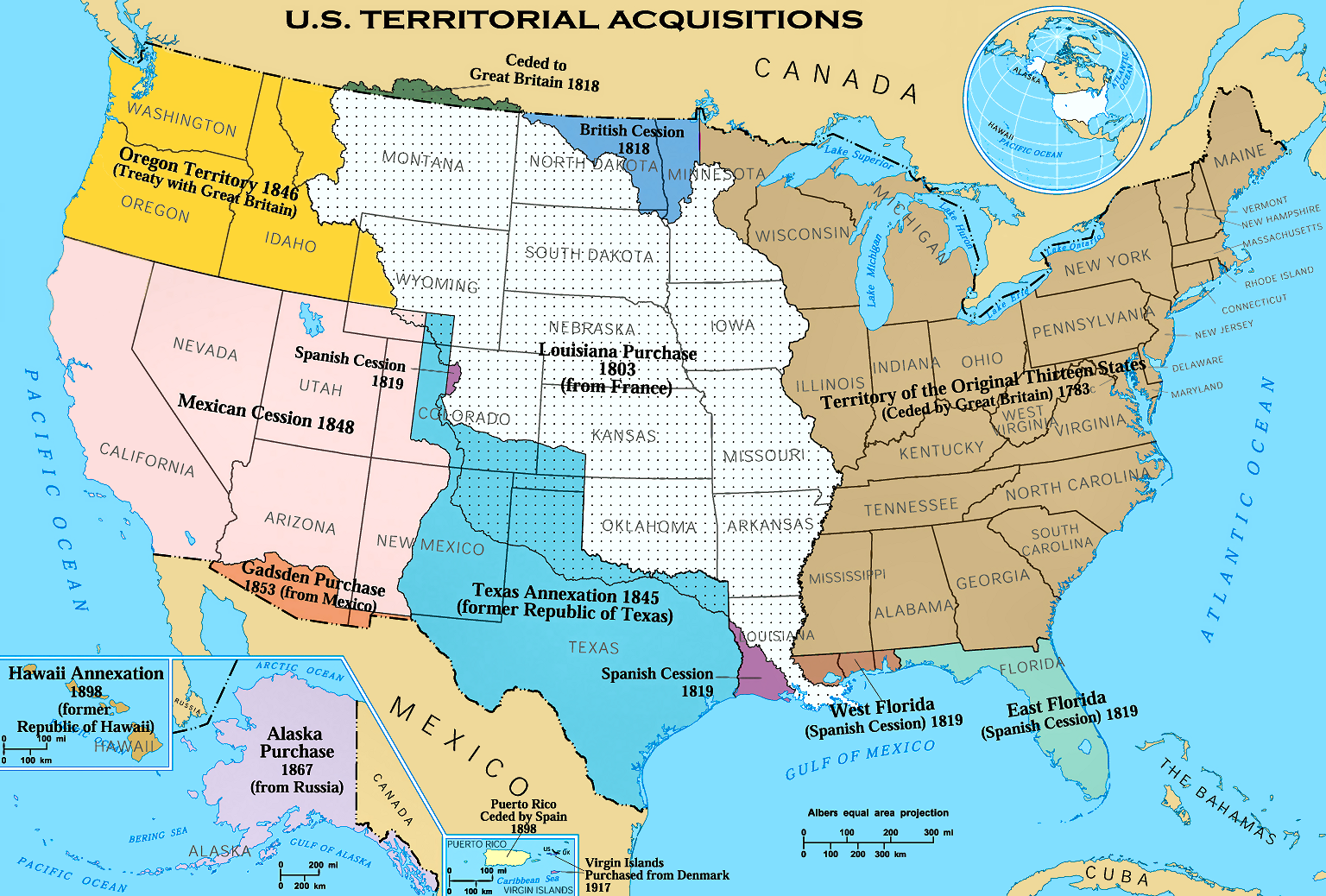
National Atlas map (from circa 2005) depicting historical United States territorial acquisitions

The National Atlas of the United States was an atlas published by the United States Department of the Interior from 1874 to 1997.

Older editions were printed, but the most recent edition was available online. Since it is a publication of the United States government, the atlas and its maps are in the public domain within the U.S.

According to the U.S. National Atlas website, this atlas "provided a comprehensive, maplike view into the enormous wealth of geospatial and geostatistical data collected for the United States." Its purpose was also to increase "geographic knowledge and understanding and to foster national self-awareness." Information used to develop the National Atlas of the United States was also used in conjunction with Canadian and Mexican information to produce continental-scale tools such as the North American Environmental Atlas.

The online National Atlas of the United States contained thousands of printable maps, fully documented digital cartographic datasets, wall maps, Web map and feature services that complied with Open Geospatial Consortium standards, multimedia dynamic maps, and innovative mapping applications.

In late 2013, mapping managers at the U.S. Geological Survey decided to end the program despite the fact that nationalatlas.gov received three times the use of its other mapping service nationalmap.gov. The demise of the National Atlas was announced in February 2014 and nationalatlas.gov was taken offline on October 1, 2014.

Since the Atlas' retirement, its data remains available in two places:

- Data published in the National Atlas is archived as 1997-2014 Edition of The National Atlas of the United States on the U.S. government's website.
- The U.S. Geological Survey continues to make at least a subset of the National Atlas data available under its National Map Small Scale Collection. A few of the datasets have been updated since the Atlas retired.

== History ==
=== 1874 edition ===
The first national atlas of the United States, titled the Statistical Atlas of the United States Based on the Results of the Ninth Census 1870, was published in 1874. Francis A. Walker, the Superintendent of the 1870 United States census compiled this atlas "with contributions from many eminent men of science and several departments of the government." The 1874 U.S. National Atlas contained population maps as well as economic and natural resources maps (including maps of forests, precious metals, coal, climate, and crops).

=== 1920 edition ===
Henry Gannett, who worked as the Chief Geographer of both the U.S. Census Bureau and the U.S. Geological Survey (USGS), led the production of three additional national atlases of the United States after 1874, with the last of these atlases being published in 1920.

National Atlas logo

=== 1970 edition ===
The next edition of the national atlas of the United States was issued in 1970—half a century later. The USGS and its chief geographer Dr. Arch C. Gerlach oversaw the preparation and production (which took several years to complete) of the 1970 U.S. National Atlas as well. The 1970 atlas weighed twelve pounds, contained four hundred pages, and had a collection of 765 maps. These maps showed "scientific information from a variety of Federal sources and depicted the principal characteristics of the country, including its physical features, historical evolution, economic activities, sociocultural conditions, administrative subdivisions, and place in world affairs."

The 1970 atlas was primarily created for use by United States government officials, researchers, and others who need "to visualize country-wide patterns and relationships between environmental phenomena and human activities". 15,000 copies of the 1970 atlas were printed, and its price of US$100 (equivalent to $829 in 2025) made it cost-prohibitive for most Americans. A majority of those 15,000 copies were bought by schools and libraries.

=== 1997 edition ===
The final National Atlas of the United States was created in 1997 and was published online through the first nine months of 2014. The USGS led the creation of this edition of the National Atlas, but more than twenty U.S. federal agencies cooperated in producing it. Its varied products and services included the first online interactive mapping program offered by the Federal government.

==== Availability of 1997-2014 Atlas data ====
The National Atlas data was taken down from the USGS website; however, the site indicates that printable maps are archived on The Internet Archive's Wayback Machine. The maps can be printed or downloaded, but not previewed.

The USGS has updated a handful of the Atlas datasets on its pages since the Atlas retired.

Datasets from the National Atlas can be downloaded from EarthExplorer .

Small-scale geologic data is on the Mineral Resources Online Spatial Data (MRDATA) site.

Some small-scale data, containing National Atlas data, are available through the National Map Downloader or Staged Products.
