= Malaria Atlas Project =

Academic group

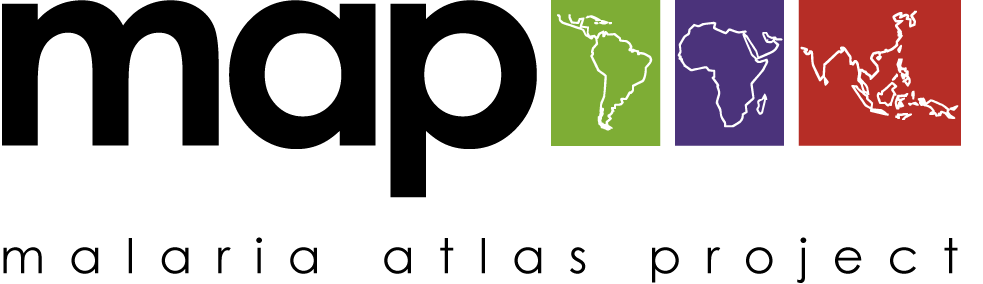
- Abbreviation: MAP
- Formation: 1 May 2006; 19 years ago
- Purpose: Determining spatial limits of Plasmodium falciparum and Plasmodium vivax malaria at a global scale and its endemicity within this range
- Headquarters: Perth, Australia
- Region served: Global
- Official language: English
- Head of Group: Peter Gething
- Parent organization: Telethon Kids Institute
- Website: malariaatlas.org

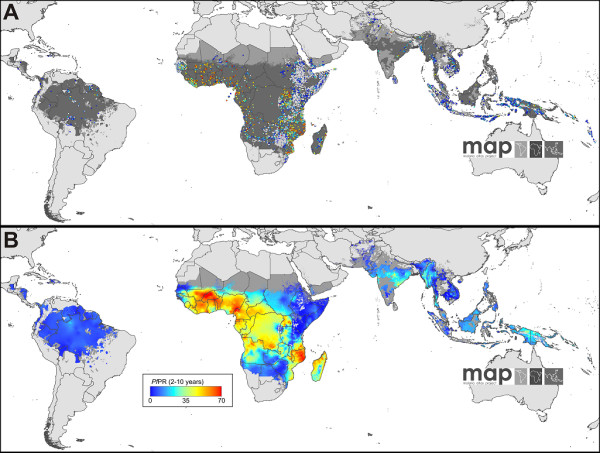
World map of Plasmodium falciparum endemicity in 2010

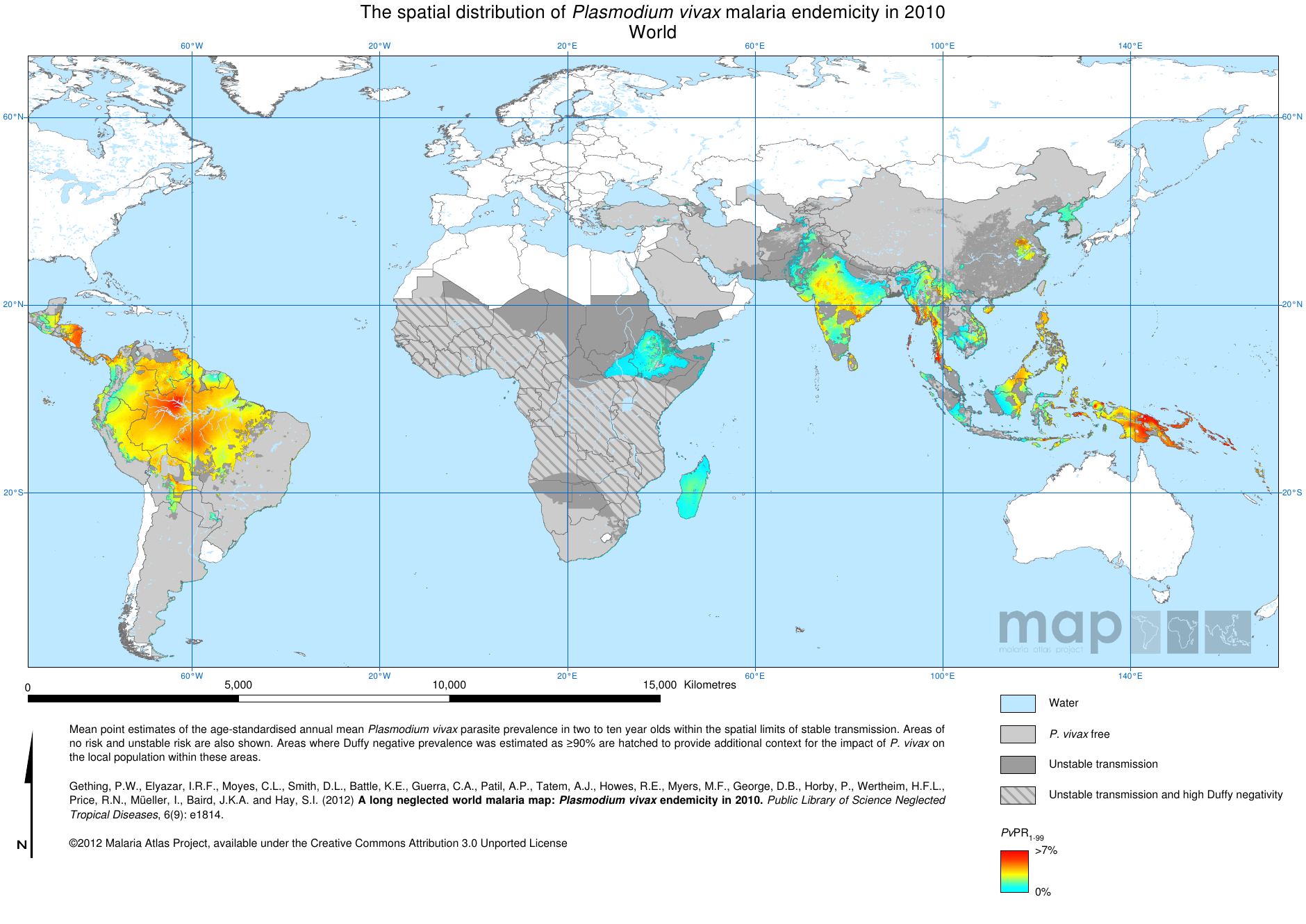
World map of Plasmodium vivax endemicity in 2010

The Malaria Atlas Project (MAP) is a nonprofit academic group led by Peter Gething, Kerry M Stokes Chair in Child Health, at the Telethon Kids Institute, Perth, Western Australia. The group is funded by the Bill and Melinda Gates Foundation, with previous funding also coming from the Medical Research Council and the Wellcome Trust. MAP aims to disseminate free, accurate, and up-to-date information on malaria and associated topics, organised on a geographical basis. The work of MAP falls into three areas:

- Estimation of the spatial distribution of malaria prevalence and incidence and related topics, such as the spatial distribution of insecticide treated nets, antimalarial drugs, mosquito vectors, and human blood disorders
- Disseminating data on malaria via the Repository for Open Access Data (ROAD-MAP) project
- Providing maps relating to malaria prevalence and related topics for the World Health Organization (WHO) and other bodies

The MAP team have assembled a unique spatial database on linked information derived from medical intelligence, satellite-derived climate data to constrain the limits of malaria transmission, and the largest-ever archive of community-based estimates of parasite prevalence. These data have been assembled and analysed by a team of geographers, statisticians, epidemiologists, biologists, and public health specialists. Furthermore, where these data have been cleared for release, they are available via a data explorer tool on the MAP website.

== History ==
MAP was founded by Bob Snow and Simon Hay in 2005 to fill the niche for the malaria control community at a global scale. Between 2012 and 2015, it was led by Peter Gething, Dave Smith, Catherine Moyes, and Simon Hay. The initial focus of MAP centred on predicting the endemicity of Plasmodium falciparum, the most deadly form of the malaria parasite, due to its global epidemiological significance and its better prospects for elimination and control. Work in 2009 began to map the extent and burden of the relatively neglected Plasmodium vivax.

The Repository for Open Access Data from the Malaria Atlas Project (ROAD-MAP) was established in 2011.

The project moved from the University of Oxford in the UK to the Telethon Kids Institute in Perth, Western Australia, in September 2019.

In late 2023, an East African branch of MAP was established at the Ifakara Health Institute in Dar es Salaam, Tanzania.

== Academic research ==
=== Modelling malaria prevalence ===
A key aspect of MAP's work is to use statistical approaches to modelling the prevalence of different forms of malaria on a global scale using Bayesian model-based geostatistics.

==== Plasmodium falciparum prevalence maps ====
In September 2015, research by MAP published in Nature quantified the attributable effect of malaria disease control efforts in Africa. The results showed Plasmodium falciparum infection prevalence in endemic Africa halved and the incidence of clinical disease fell by 40% between 2000 and 2015. The best estimate is that interventions have averted 663 million clinical cases since 2000. Insecticide-treated nets, the most widespread intervention, were by far the largest contributor. Although still below target levels, current malaria interventions have substantially reduced malaria disease incidence across the continent.

==== Plasmodium vivax prevalence maps ====
In 2012, MAP published the first global maps for Plasmodium vivax endemicity.

== See also ==
- Center for Disease Dynamics, Economics & Policy
- The AfriPop Project
