= Geobrowsing =

Geobrowsing is seeking and accessing information on the Internet via a method that is reverse of the traditional Web navigational path. Rather than navigating through a series of linear or non-linear hyperlinks, users browse content visually — typically on a map — similar to the way they think, and then navigate down to the textual information.

An example of this would be the confluence of "points of interest," the user's location and a virtual map coming together to allow the user to efficiently find what they are looking for within a specified radius from where they are standing. Other tenets of Geobrowsing include the user's presence and the presence of friends, the ability to interact among those friends and other contextual information.

Geobrowsing as a concept has its roots in AOL, where it was prototyped in the late 1990s. Today, XOHM is generally credited for pioneering initial demonstrations of Geobrowsing on its mobile broadband network, now merged with Clear.
