= NMEA 2000 =

Marine plug-and-play communications standard

NMEA 2000, abbreviated to NMEA2k or N2K and standardized as IEC 61162-3, is a plug-and-play communications standard used for connecting marine sensors and display units within ships and boats. The standard is maintained by the National Marine Electronics Association (NMEA). NMEA is often confused with the NEMA (National Electrical Manufacturers Association) though they are unrelated.

Communication runs at 250 kilobits-per-second and allows any sensor to talk to any display unit or other device compatible with NMEA 2000 protocols.

== Details ==
Electrically, NMEA 2000 is compatible with the Controller Area Network ("CAN Bus") used on road vehicles and fuel engines. The higher-level protocol format is based on SAE J1939, with specific messages for the marine environment. Raymarine SeaTalk 2, Raymarine SeaTalk^{NG}, Simrad Simnet, and Furuno CAN are rebranded implementations of NMEA 2000, though may use physical connectors different from the standardised DeviceNet 5-pin A-coded M12 screw connector, all of which are electrically compatible and can be directly connected.

The protocol is used to create a network of electronic devices—chiefly marine instruments—on a boat. Various instruments that meet the NMEA 2000 standard are connected to one central cable, known as a backbone. The backbone powers each instrument and relays data among all of the instruments on the network. This allows one display unit to show many different types of information. It also allows the instruments to work together, since they share data. NMEA 2000 is meant to be "plug and play" to allow devices made by different manufacturers to communicate with each other.

Examples of marine electronics devices to include in a network are GNSS receivers, autopilots, wind instruments, depth sounders, navigation instruments, engine instruments, and nautical chart plotters. The interconnectivity among instruments in the network allows, for example, the GNSS receiver to correct the course that the autopilot is steering.

== History ==
The NMEA 2000 standard was defined by, and is controlled by, the US-based National Marine Electronics Association (NMEA). Although the NMEA divulges some information regarding the standard, it claims copyright over the standard and thus its full contents are not publicly available. For example, the NMEA publicizes which messages exist and which fields they contain, but they do not disclose how to interpret the values contained in those fields. However, enthusiasts are slowly making progress in discovering these PGN definitions.

== Functionality ==
NMEA 2000 connects devices using Controller Area Network (CAN) technology originally developed for the auto industry. NMEA 2000 is based on the SAE J1939 high-level protocol, but defines its own messages. NMEA 2000 devices and J1939 devices can be made to co-exist on the same physical network.

NMEA 2000 (IEC 61162-3) can be considered a successor to the NMEA 0183 (IEC 61162-1) serial data bus standard. It has a significantly higher data rate (250k bits/second vs. 4800 bits/second for NMEA 0183). It uses a compact binary message format as opposed to the ASCII serial communications protocol used by NMEA 0183. Another improvement is that NMEA 2000 supports a disciplined multiple-talker, multiple-listener data network whereas NMEA 0183 requires a single-talker, multiple-listener (simplex) serial communications protocol.

== Network construction ==
The NMEA 2000 network, like the SAE J1939 network on which it is based, is organized around a bus topology, and requires a single 120Ω termination resistor at each end of the bus. (The resistors are in parallel, so a properly terminated bus should have a total resistance of 60Ω). The maximum distance for any device from the bus is six metres. The maximum backbone cable length is 250 meters (820 feet) with Mini cable backbone or 100 meters (328 feet) with Micro cable backbone

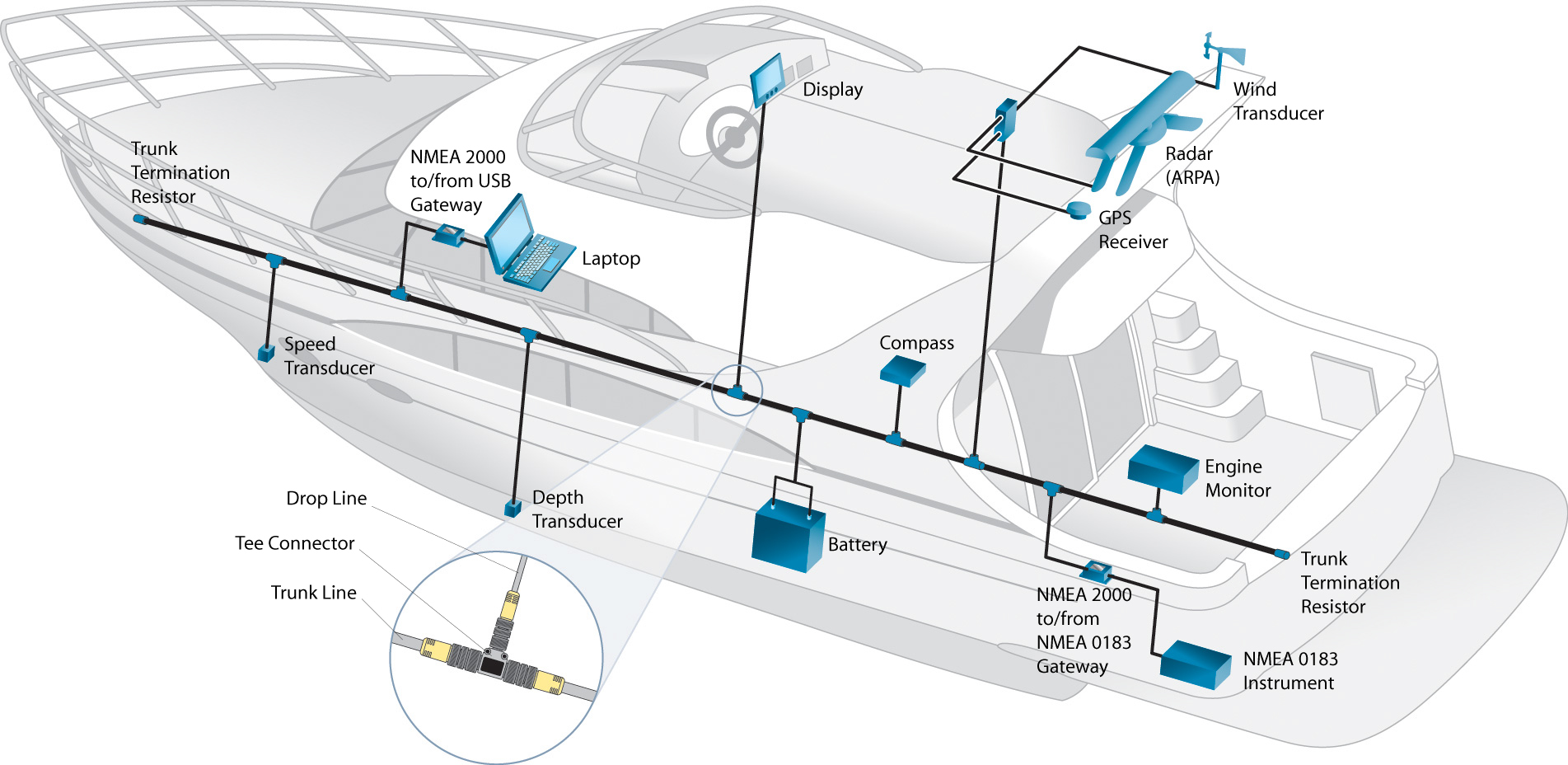
Typical NMEA 2000 Network Installation

== Cabling and interconnect ==
The only cabling standard approved by the NMEA for use with NMEA 2000 networks is the DeviceNet cabling standard, which is controlled by the Open DeviceNet Vendors Association. Such cabling systems are permitted to be labeled "NMEA 2000 Approved". The DeviceNet standard defines levels of shielding, conductor size, weather resistance, and flexibility which are not necessarily met by other cabling solutions marketed as "NMEA 2000" compatible.

There are two sizes of cabling defined by the DeviceNet/NMEA 2000 standard. The larger of the two sizes is denoted as "Mini" (or alternatively, "Thick") cable, and is rated to carry up to 8 amperes of power supply current. The smaller of the two sizes is denoted as "Micro" (or alternatively, "Thin") cable using the M12 5-pin barrel connector specified in IEC 61076-2-101, and is rated to carry up to 3 amperes of power supply current.

Mini cable is primarily used as a "backbone" (or "trunk") for networks on larger vessels (typically with lengths of 20 m and above), with Micro cable used for connections between the network backbone and the individual components. Networks on smaller vessels often are constructed entirely of Micro cable and connectors.

An NMEA 2000 network is not electrically compatible with an NMEA 0183 network, and so an interface device is required to send messages between devices on the different types of network. An adapter is also required if NMEA 2000 messages are to be received by or transmitted from a PC.

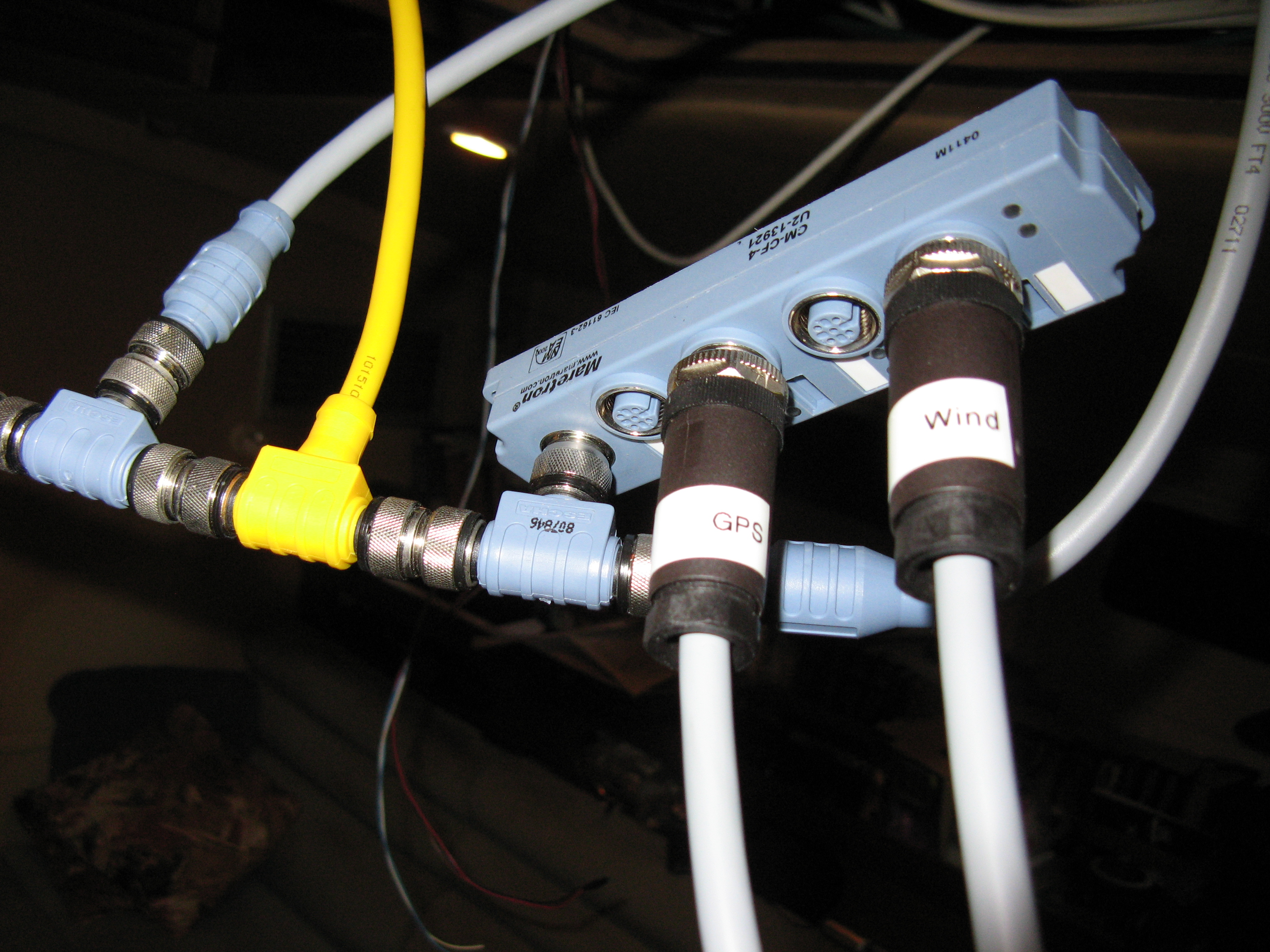
NMEA-2000 cabling components incl. power-T

== Message format and parameter group numbers (PGNs) ==
In accordance with the SAE J1939 protocol, NMEA 2000 messages are sent as packets that consist of a header followed by (typically) 8 bytes of data. The header for a message specifies the transmitting device, the device to which the message was sent (which may be all devices), the message priority, and the PGN (Parameter Group Number). The PGN indicates which message is being sent, and thus how the data bytes should be interpreted to determine the values of the data fields that the message contains.

== Device certification ==
Devices go through a certification process overseen by the NMEA, and are permitted to display the "NMEA 2000 Certified" logo once they have completed the certification process. The certification process does not guarantee data content, that is the responsibility of the manufacturers. However, the certification process does assure that products from different manufacturers exchange data in a compatible way and that they can coexist on a network.

== NMEA 2000 and proprietary networks ==
Several manufacturers, including Simrad, Raymarine, Stowe, and BRP, have their own proprietary networks that are compatible with or akin to NMEA 2000. Simrad's is called SimNet, Raymarine's is called SeaTalk NG, Stowe's is called Dataline 2000, and BRP's is called CZone. Some of these, such as SimNet and Seatalk NG, are a standard NMEA 2000 network but use non-standard connectors and cabling; adapters are available to convert to standard NMEA 2000 connectors, or the user can simply remove the connector and make a direct connection.

== Trademarks ==
The term "NMEA 2000" is a registered trademark of the National Marine Electronics Association. Devices which are not "NMEA 2000 Certified" may not legally use the NMEA 2000 trademark in their advertising.

== Manufacturers ==
The following are some of the companies that have registered with the NMEA for the purpose of producing NMEA 2000 certified products:

- Actisense
- Airmar
- Amphenol LTW
- Böning
- Carling Technologies
- Dometic (formerly SeaStar Solutions & Teleflex Marine)
- EmpirBus
- Furuno
- Garmin
- GME Standard Communications
- Honda
- Hemisphere GNSS
- Humminbird
- Icom Incorporated
- KUS Americas Inc
- Lowrance Electronics
- Maretron
- MarineCraft
- Molex
- Navico
- Quark-elec (UK)
- Raymarine
- Samyung ENC
- Simrad Yachting
- Tohatsu
- VeeThree
- Warwick Control Technologies
- Yacht Devices
- Yamaha Marine

== See also ==
- Marine electronics
- GPS Exchange Format

Related standards

- NMEA 0183
- NMEA OneNet, a future standard based on Ethernet

Safety Standards using NMEA 2000

- Automatic Identification System
