= Itinerary file =

File format for TomTom devices

ITN Itinerary file
- Filename extension: .itn
- Internet media type: application/itn
- Initial release: 2000
- Extended from: TXT
- Website: https://www.tomtom.com/lib/doc/TomTomTips/index.html?itinerary_as_text_file.htm

ITN, is a file format designed as an itinerary data format for TomTom devices.

It can be used to describe itineraries using support waypoints. The format is proprietary for TomTom. Its data store location, name, and waypoint type and can in this way be used to interchange data between GPS devices and software packages. Such computer programs allow users, for example, to create and modify itineraries.

== Data types ==
The file format assumes that each line in it holds a supporting waypoint:

longitude|latitude|description|type|

The type specifies whether how to handle this waypoint:

Type	Meaning
0	Regular waypoint
1	Waypoint is disabled (will be skipped when navigating the itinerary, appears dimmed in the itinerary overview)
2	Stopover or destination
3	Stopover is disabled (will be skipped when navigating the itinerary, appears dimmed in the itinerary overview)
4	Departure point (should only be set for the first item in the itinerary file)

== Units ==
Latitude and longitude are expressed in fixed point integer numbers using the WGS 84 datum. Please note these numbers are the floating point values times 100,000, e.g. the latitude 52.493601 will be shown as 5249360.

It is allowed to prefix these numbers with + or -.

== Sample ITN document ==
The following is an ITN file produced by a TomTom hand-held GPS unit. This document does not show all functionality which can be stored in the ITN format but its purpose is to serve as a brief illustration.

490843|5237653|Amsterdam Central Station|4|
496283|5226712|Abcoude Park and Ride|0|
507226|5208633|Stadsbaan Utrecht|0|
509797|5199465|Company in Vianen|2|

== Limitations ==
TomTom devices as of 2014 will only accept at most 255 waypoints. Devices before that allow 32 or 48 at most, with an exception for the Rider product range, allowing 100 waypoints.

It is unknown what the maximum length of the description field is allowed to be, most applications assume 64 characters. The character encoding of the description is assumed to be Windows-1252 (the Latin alphabet), sometimes called ANSI. This character set allows 224 different characters to be used, supporting most European languages.

TomTom decided in 2015 to deprecate the ITN format in favour of the more versatile GPX format. ITN is still supported as an import format.

== See also ==
- Concepts
  - Point of Interest
- File Formats
  - GPX, a standard for routes, tracks and waypoints.
  - KML, the equivalent format compatible with Google Earth.
- Software
  - GPSBabel, used to upload/download/convert ITN files
  - ITN Converter, used to create/convert ITN files
