= Marine electronics =

Marine electronics refers to electronics devices designed and classed for use in the marine environment on board ships and yachts where even a small amount of salt water can destroy some electronics devices. Therefore, the majority of these types of devices are either water resistant or waterproof.

Marine electronics devices include chartplotter, marine VHF radio, autopilot and self-steering gear, fishfinder and sonar, marine radar, satellite navigation device, fibre optic gyrocompass, satellite television, and marine fuel management.

== Communication ==
The electronics devices communicate by using a protocol defined by National Marine Electronics Association(NMEA), with two standards available, NMEA 0183 (serial communication network) and NMEA 2000 (controller-area network based technology). There is also Lightweight Ethernet (LWE).

In recent years, the International Electrotechnical Commission (IEC) has created a new standards suite for "Digital interfaces for navigational equipment within a ship". This is known as IEC 61162 and included NMEA 0183, NMEA 2000 and LWE.

Additionally, different suppliers of marine electronics have their own communications protocol.

- A+T Instruments has ESP Ethernet over Ships Power
- B&G has FastNet
- Furuno has NavNet ("NavNet" refers to a product family, and is not a communications protocol. Furuno uses industry standard NMEA 0183, NMEA 2000, and standard Ethernet for communications protocol in their products)
- Mastervolt has CZone
- Nexus has FDX
- Raymarine has Seatalk / SeatalkNG
- Simrad has SimNet
- Stowe has Dataline

Marine Electronics Communications
Standard	Electrical standard	Protocol type	Connector	Simplex/duplex	Termination	Manufacturer	Compatibility	Power	Notes
NMEA 0180/0182	RS-232	ASCII serial		Simplex					
NMEA 0183	RS-422	ASCII serial	Terminals	Simplex	N/A	Various			4800baud 8N1
Seatalk	RS-422	ASCII serial				Raymarine			4800baud
NMEA 2000	CAN bus	SAE J1939 binary	DeviceNet 5-pin A-coded M12 screw connector	Duplex	120R	Various			IEC 61162-3, 250kbs
SeaTalk^{NG}	CAN bus	SAE J1939 Binary	Proprietary	Duplex	120R	Raymarine	NMEA 2000		
Simnet	CAN bus	SAE J1939 Binary		Duplex	120R	Simrad	NMEA 2000		
Furuno CAN	CAN bus	SAE J1939 binary			Furno		NMEA 2000		
Signal K	Ethernet, WiFi	HTTP							
NMEA OneNet	Ethernet, WiFi								
SeaTalk^{hs}	Ethernet, WiFi		RayNet			Raymarine			

== Navigation ==
Another important part of marine electronics is the navigation equipment. Here compasses, which includes both gyrocompasses and magnetic compasses, make up for equipment that is used by the entire shipping industry.

== Industry ==
Some manufacturers specialize more in equipment for commercial vessels such as tankers and general cargo vessels. This industry is relatively small with worldwide sales of $3.2 billion in 2015. The top manufacturer is Garmin's Marine division with a turnover of US$917 Million in 2023 followed by Brunswick-owned Navico Group (Simrad, Lowrance, B&G and several other brands), with a turnover of US$915 Million (although this includes sales of equipment which is not marine electronics, such as batteries, cables and pumps). Other popular brands are Japan-based Furuno, Japan Radio Company, Wärtsilä and Raymarine.
