= Simrad =

Simrad may refer to:

- Simrad, a brand name used by Kongsberg Maritime
- Simrad Optronics, a Norwegian company that manufactures defence equipment
- Simrad Yachting, a manufacturer of marine electronics for the leisure and professional markets
- SimRAD (Simulation Research, Analysis, and Design), an educational program from Illinois State University, dissolved and turn into Game Designers' Workshop.
