= Raymarine Marine Electronics =

Marine electronics manufacturer

Raymarine
- Type: Public
- Traded as: Nasdaq: FLIR
- ISIN: US3024451011
- Industry: Marine Electronics
- Headquarters: Fareham, UK,
- Area served: Global
- Website: www.raymarine.com

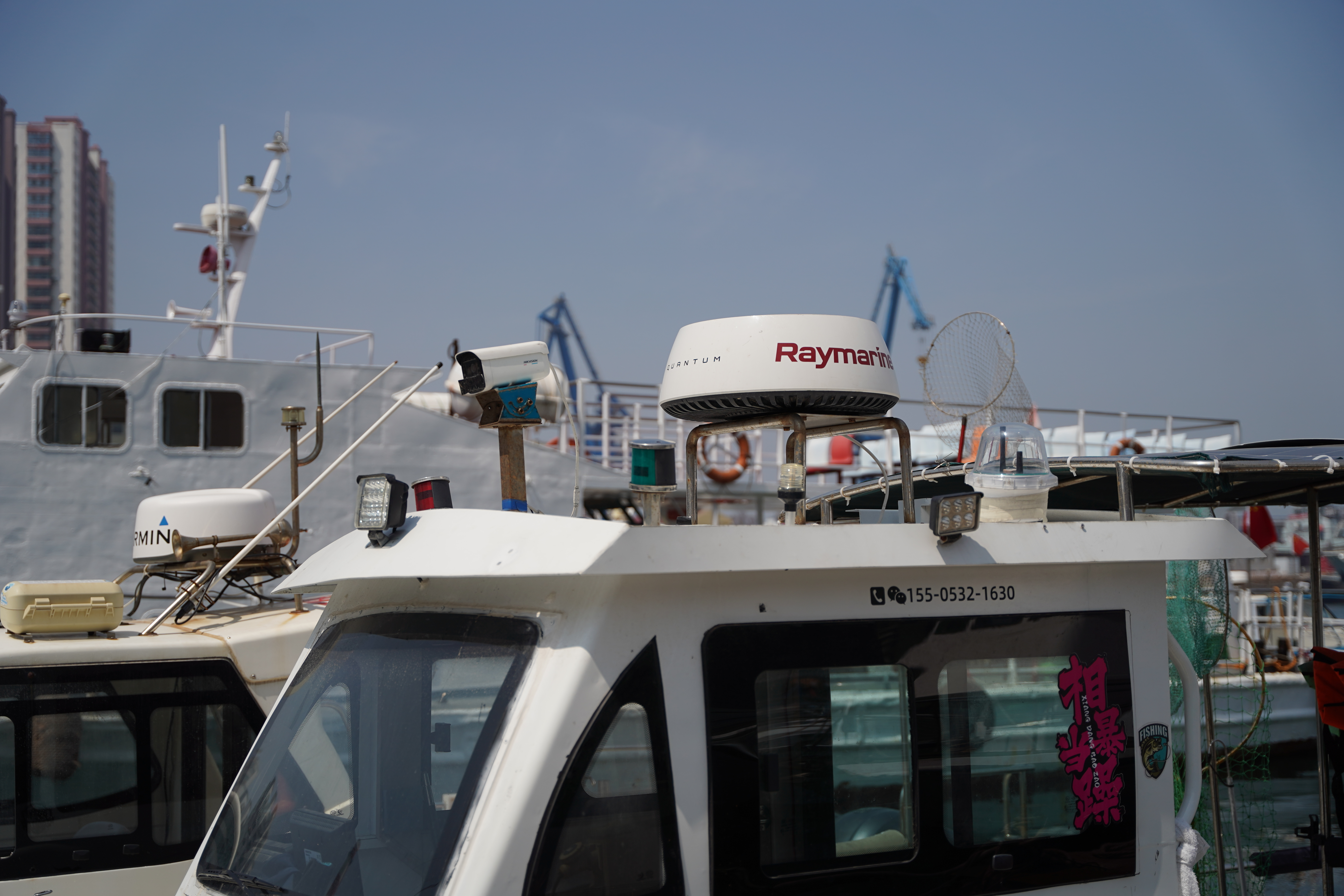
A Raymarine Quantum marine radar mounted on top of a Chinese fishing boat.

Raymarine is a manufacturer and major supplier of electronic equipment for marine use. The company targets both recreational and light commercial markets with their products, which include:

- GPS Chartplotters
- VHF Radios
- Digital Fishfinders / Sonar
- Radar
- Self-steering gear (Autohelm / Autopilot)
- Satellite television
- Software

The Raymarine brand has been on the market for over 80 years. Within this time, their product range has included visual navigation information equipment. Their products work with performance sensors that operate along with intelligence operating systems. Raymarine has a global service network that operates in over 80 countries all over the world.

Until 2005, the company manufactured the majority of its products, but then started outsourcing the production process. A year later the company declared to have completed this reorganization. The company focuses on development, marketing, sales and service.

Raymarine has been taking charge of the distribution of its products for a number of years. This is done, among other ways, by purchasing national distributors (such as Eissing in Germany and SD Marine in France) or opening their own branches, so-called subsidiaries. On 1 July 2011, Raymarine Nederland's own branch (in Velp) was opened, after the then importer, Holland Nautic Apeldoorn, had indicated that it wanted to stop distributing the brand.

== History ==
The company began as a division of the American company Raytheon, a manufacturer of defense systems, when it launched its first echo depth sounder in 1923.

In 1958, Raytheon was able to increase its product offering and market share through the takeover of Apelco.

In 1974, Derek Fawcett, a British-born inventor and long-time sailor, founded Nautech. In the beginning, the company had only one product: automatic steering systems for which it used the brand name Autohelm. Due to the great success of these systems, the company was able to offer an ever-wider range of systems. In 1989, Fawcett came up with the SeaTalk network, a digital-communications protocol that allowed Autohelm units to "talk" with other onboard instrumentation via a single-cable connection (a predecessor to contemporary NMEA 0183 and NMEA 2000 protocols). In 1990 Raytheon purchased Nautech, mainly so the American-based firm could access Nautech's extensive European distribution and sell its radars on the continent.

Due to reorganizations in 1993 and 1998, the current Raymarine – at the time still under the name of the parent company – was created.

In January 2001, Raymarine was formed when the division was acquired in a management buy-out backed by Hg. In December 2004 the company was floated on the London Stock Exchange quadrupling Hg's investment.

In 2005, the company was involved in Ellen MacArthur's solo world circumnavigation.

The 2008 financial crisis hit Raymarine, and the recreational boating industry in general, hard. In May 2010 with Raymarine's lenders forcing the company into administration (the British version of business bankruptcy) the company was acquired by FLIR Systems.
