= National Marine Electronics Association =

The National Marine Electronics Association (NMEA) is a US-based marine electronics trade organization setting standards of communication between marine electronics.

== Standards ==
=== NMEA 0183 ===
NMEA 0183 is a combined electrical and data specification for communication between marine electronics such as echo sounder, sonars, anemometer, gyrocompass, autopilot, GPS receivers and many other types of instruments. It has been defined and is controlled by the National Marine Electronics Association (NMEA). It replaces the earlier NMEA 0180 and NMEA 0182 standards. In leisure marine applications, it is slowly being phased out in favor of the newer NMEA 2000 standard, though NMEA 0183 remains the norm in commercial shipping.

=== NMEA 2000 ===
NMEA 2000, abbreviated to NMEA2k or N2K and standardized as IEC 61162-3, is a plug-and-play communications standard used for connecting marine sensors and display units within ships and boats.

Communication runs at 250 kilobits-per-second and allows any sensor to talk to any display unit or other device compatible with NMEA 2000 protocols.

=== NMEA OneNet ===
NMEA OneNet is the latest standard for maritime data networking based on 802.3 Ethernet, and will complement existing onboard NMEA 2000 networks by allowing for high-capacity data transfers.

Current maritime data networks have bandwidth capacities of less than 1 Mbit/s. Building on Ethernet, OneNet allows for capacity in the hundreds or thousands of megabits per second. This extra bandwidth is needed for transferring unprocessed sensor data from sonar/radars, as well as video feeds from for example an engine room.

The primary features and goals of OneNet are as follows:

- NMEA 2000 data transfer over IPv6 in a standard format
- High-bandwidth applications such as radar, video and more that are not possible via NMEA 2000
- Support Ethernet and TCP/IP at 1 gigabit and faster speeds
- Power devices via Power over Ethernet
- Utilize standardized connectors (RJ-45 and X-Coded M12) depending on installation
- Robust, industry-standard cybersecurity requirements
- NMEA 2000 gateway compatibility
- Mandatory device & application certification by the manufacturer, then verified by NMEA

The use of the X-Coded M12 connector allows for up to 10 Gigabit Ethernet, but the full capabilities do not have to be utilized, and would also depend on the cabling that is installed.

== See also ==
- Radio Technical Commission for Maritime Services
