= Bridge navigational watch alarm system =

Alarm system used in shipping

A Bridge Navigational Watch Alarm System, abbreviated BNWAS, is an automatic system which sounds an alarm if the watch officer on the bridge of a ship falls asleep, becomes otherwise incapacitated, or is absent for too long a time.

== Process ==
The BNWAS is automatically engaged when the ship's autopilot is activated.

The minimum requirement for a BNWAS under International Maritime Organization standards is to have a dormant stage and three alarm stages, except that on a non-passenger vessel, the second stage may be omitted.

== Alarm stages ==
Stage 1: When the autopilot is engaged, the bridge officer is required to signal his presence to the BNWAS system every 3 to 12 minutes in response to a flashing light, either by moving an arm in front of a motion sensor, pressing a confirmation button, or directly applying pressure to the BNWAS centre.

Stage 2: When a confirmation signal fails to occur within 15 seconds in Stage 1, an alarm will sound on the bridge, and if there is still no confirmation signal after a further 15 seconds, in the captain's and the first officer's cabins. One of them must then go to the bridge and cancel the alarm.

Stage 3: If neither the captain nor the first officer cancels the alarm within a specified time period (between 90 seconds and 3 minutes depending on the size of the vessel), an alarm will sound in locations where other personnel are usually available.

In addition an emergency call function may be provided, by which bridge personnel can activate a Stage 2 or Stage 3 alarm to call for help.

== Classification by size ==
IMO requirements under the SOLAS resulting from an amendment of June 5, 2009, come into force on the following dates for ships classified by size:

July 2011: new vessels in excess of 150 tonnes

July 2011: all passenger vessels

July 2012: all vessels in excess of 3,000 tonnes

July 2013: all vessels between 500 and 3,000 tonnes

July 2014: all vessels between 150 and 500 tonnes

Specific nations have added further regulations. For example, vessels of the Norwegian coastal fishery are required to activate a speed sensor connected to the vessel's motor or GPS.

Wired and wireless versions are available.
