= TCX =

TCX may refer to:

- Telecomix
- Tianjin Climate Exchange
- Thomas Cook Airlines (ICAO airline designator)
- Training Center XML (TCX)
