= TAIP =

TAIP may refer to:

- Taiwan Independence Party, a left-wing political party in Taiwan
- Transportes Aéreos da Índia Portuguesa
- Trimble ASCII Interface Protocol, a communications protocol for Global Positioning Systems
- YES (Lithuanian: TAIP), a political party in Lithuania
