= Samyung ENC =

- Type: Public
- Industry: Marine electronics
- Founded: 1978
- Headquarters: Busan, South Korea
- Website: www.samyungenc.com

Samyung ENC is a South Korean manufacturer of marine communication and navigation systems. The company is publicly listed and traded on the KOSDAQ.

== Market share ==
Samyung ENC is a leading company in a highly fragmented marine electronics industry that includes Raymarine, Humminbird, Lowrance, Simrad, B&G, Magellan, Murphy, Naviop, Northstar, Samyung ENC, Sitex, TwoNav, Furuno, Geonav.

== Products ==
The product line includes high frequency radio, GPS floater, and very high frequency (VHF) transmitter-receiver.
