= OpenSeaMap =

Open software mapping project

- Website type: Wiki to create a free world map.
- Available in: English, German, French, Italian, Spanish, Russian, Arabic
- Owner: Community-owned
- Creators: members of the OpenSeaMap and OpenStreetMap community
- Website: map.openseamap.org & openseamap.org
- Commercial: No
- Registration: only required for contributors
- Launched: 2009
- Content license: CC BY-SA (map), ODbL (data)

OpenSeaMap is a software project collecting freely usable nautical information and geospatial data to create a worldwide nautical chart. This chart is available on the OpenSeaMap website, and can also be downloaded for use as an electronic chart for offline applications.

The project is part of OpenStreetMap. OpenSeaMap is part of the OpenStreetMap database, and complements the spatial data with nautical information. Such data may be used in accordance with the Open Database License. This ensures integration into printed materials, websites and applications is possible, without being limited by restrictive licenses, or having to pay fees.

== History ==
The idea for the project was born at an OpenStreetMap developer conference in autumn 2008 at the Linux Hotel in Essen, Germany. A group of boaters and programmers decided to extend the coverage of OpenStreetMap to the seas and fresh water bodies. From the start the project has been worldwide and multilingual. By the end of 2009, the design and architecture of the project had been created, and a sample harbor "Warnemünde" was created to serve as an example chart. Since autumn 2009, a dedicated server has been available and the project is engaged in several collaborations with other free projects and organizations. In January 2010, OpenSeaMap was given a booth at boot Düsseldorf, Europe's largest boat show, allowing volunteers to present the project to a large audience of specialists for the first time.

== Contents of the chart ==
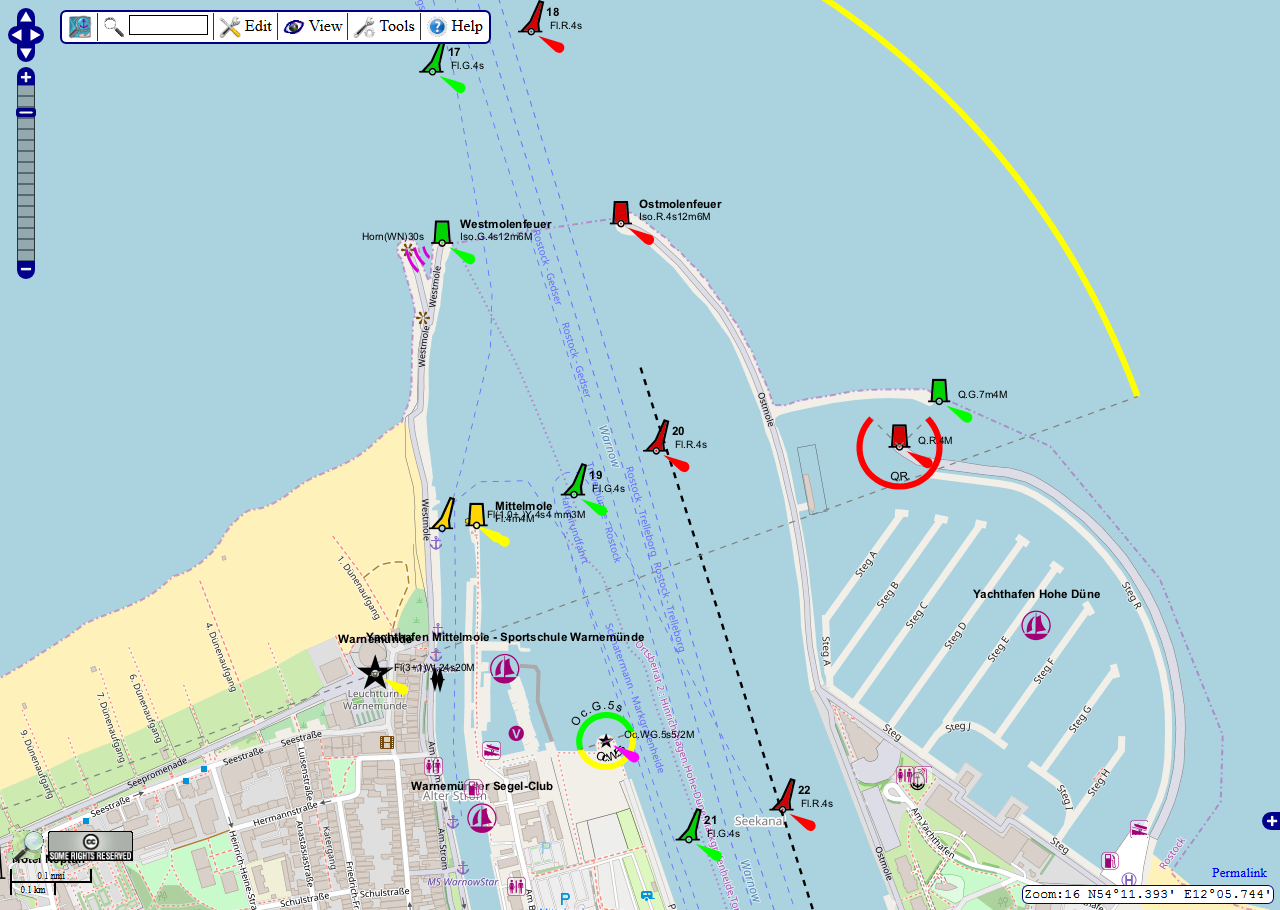

Charts will show lighthouses, lateral buoy, cardinal marks and other navigational aids. In the ports, facilities will be mapped (port wall, pier, walkways, docks, fueling stations, loading cranes, access roads, railway lines, ferry lines). Similarly, public authorities, shipbuilders and repairers, as well as sanitation and utility facilities will be displayed. The navigational attributes correspond to the international standard IHO S-57.

Water depths are not yet covered, because the database is not designed for three-dimensional coordinates. However, the plan is to eventually integrate a bathymetric model to describe the seabed.

The data are presented in multiple levels with OpenLayers on the base map of OpenStreetMap. The base map contains all the possible objects from OpenStreetMap. OpenSeaMap includes additional layers such as aids to navigation, ports and temporary racing events.

== Applications ==
The chart is for planning sailing and boat trips. It will also be useful as a guide for tourists. It is not intended to replace official charts.

Online Map
The map is available to any computer with an internet connection from the website OpenSeaMap.org. This map is updated daily.

Offline Map
The map can also be loaded on local data storage and can be used on any PC without internet access. This map will also permit use on other devices, such as GPS devices from Garmin and Lowrance, phones, and PDAs. The off-map is regularly updated, usually every week.

App for iPad, iPhone, iPod touch
The paid App for OpenSeaMap works on iPad, iPhone und iPod touch. The actual position is shown on the chart. Each downloaded chart is cached on the device and can be used without internet connection. With internet connection the app checks if there is a newer version of the chart. The Apple location search finds the fitting map section. The app works worldwide.

Navigation
With certain navigation programs, it is possible to display the current position directly on the chart via a connected GPS device, tracking a vessel's movement. An NMEA interface can run an autopilot and thus control the ship. Also, the display of AIS signals on the chart is possible. Appropriate navigation tools from the open source area are SeaClear, OpenCPN and GPSANGLER.

== Internationalization ==
The site is translated into six languages: English, German, French, Italian, Spanish and Russian. The tools and the legends are available with a German, English and French interface. On the map the place names are always written in local language and script. The geographical coverage is worldwide. Depending on the region and the active cartographers, the coverage varies but is growing daily.

== Timelines ==
Data is stored in the database as soon as it has been entered, and is immediately available worldwide. Base map data is visible on the map after a few minutes. Navigational data is currently (2010) visible on the chart about two days after it has been entered.

== Editing tools ==
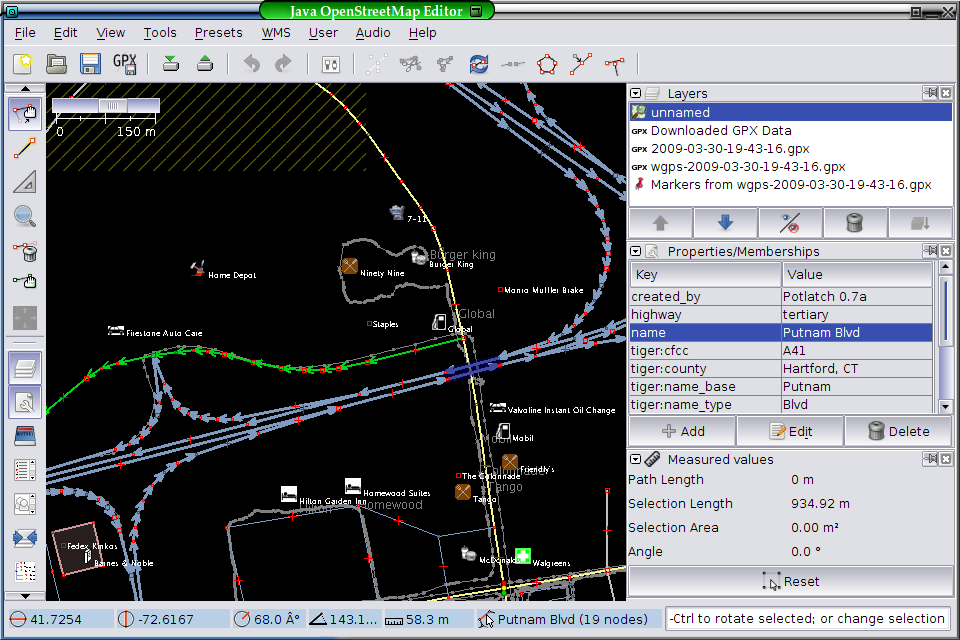
JOSM Editor

Offline Editor JOSM with navigational enhancements
JOSM is the default editor for OpenStreetMap. It has been extended for use on navigational charts with a plugin. It is written in Java and runs on multiple desktop platforms

To edit you must register with a verified email address. Registration is free and will encourage high data quality. Read access does not require registration.

Other programs can access the XML-RPC interface to the data on the server in order to read and write OpenSeaMap data.

== Harbor pilots ==
The map lists ports, marinas and anchorages. A port guide containing detailed information can be accessed through a popup window. This guide is organized as a wiki and is shaped by the users. Included is the free wikiproject "SkipperGuide". 5000 ports are accessible worldwide, including detailed descriptions of 600 marinas.

== Weather information ==
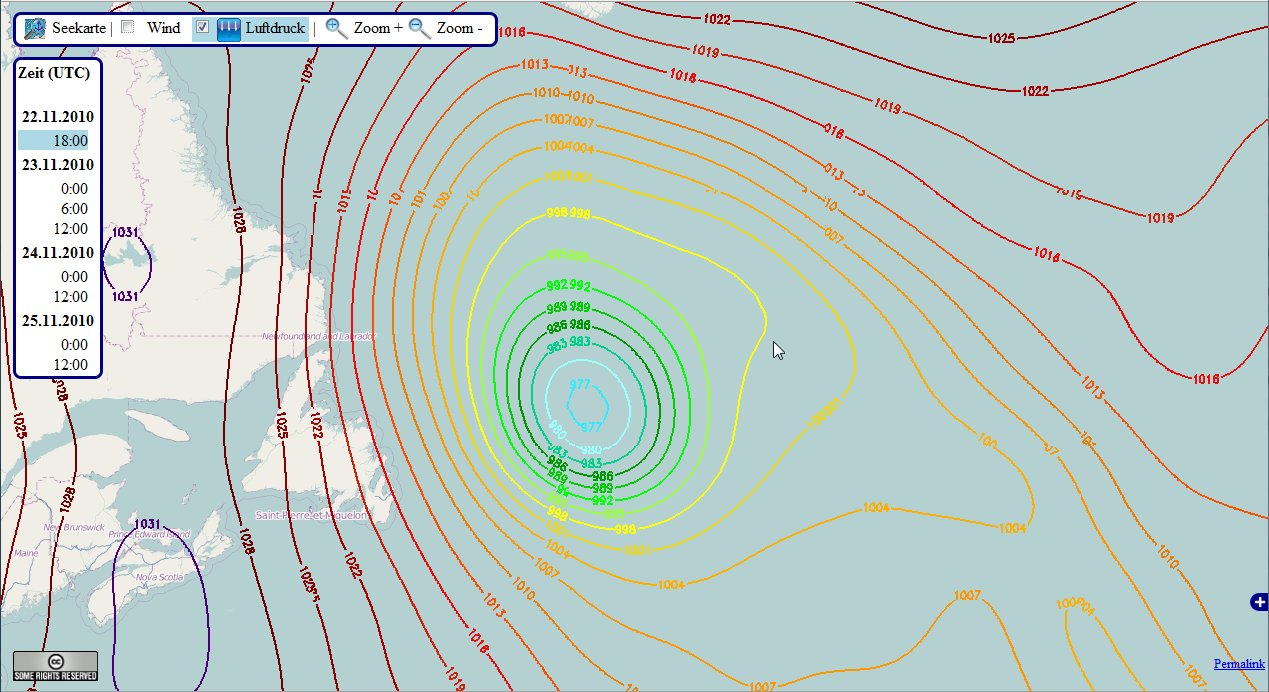
Air pressure

In worldwide weather charts there are shown weather data like wind speed, air pressure (isobars), etc., each actualised two to three times per day, and with weather forecast up to three days.

For each harbor there is a Meteogram with detailed wind forecasts and weather information for eight days. Available weather data for wind direction, wind speed, air temperature, air pressure, relative humidity, cloudiness, precipitation. From this worldwide available data the captains can predict the marine weather.

== Bathymetric data ==
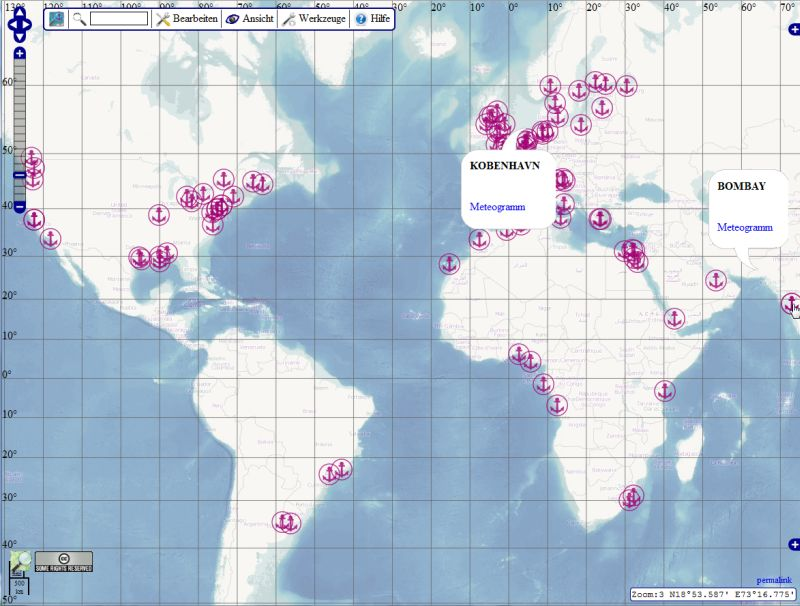
Bathymetric data

Worldwide, depths between 25 and 10,000 m are shown in a blue colour scale of 26 steps. At higher zoom levels depth contours are also displayed. The data is derived from GEBCO 2021 dataset.

== Water depths by crowdsourcing ==
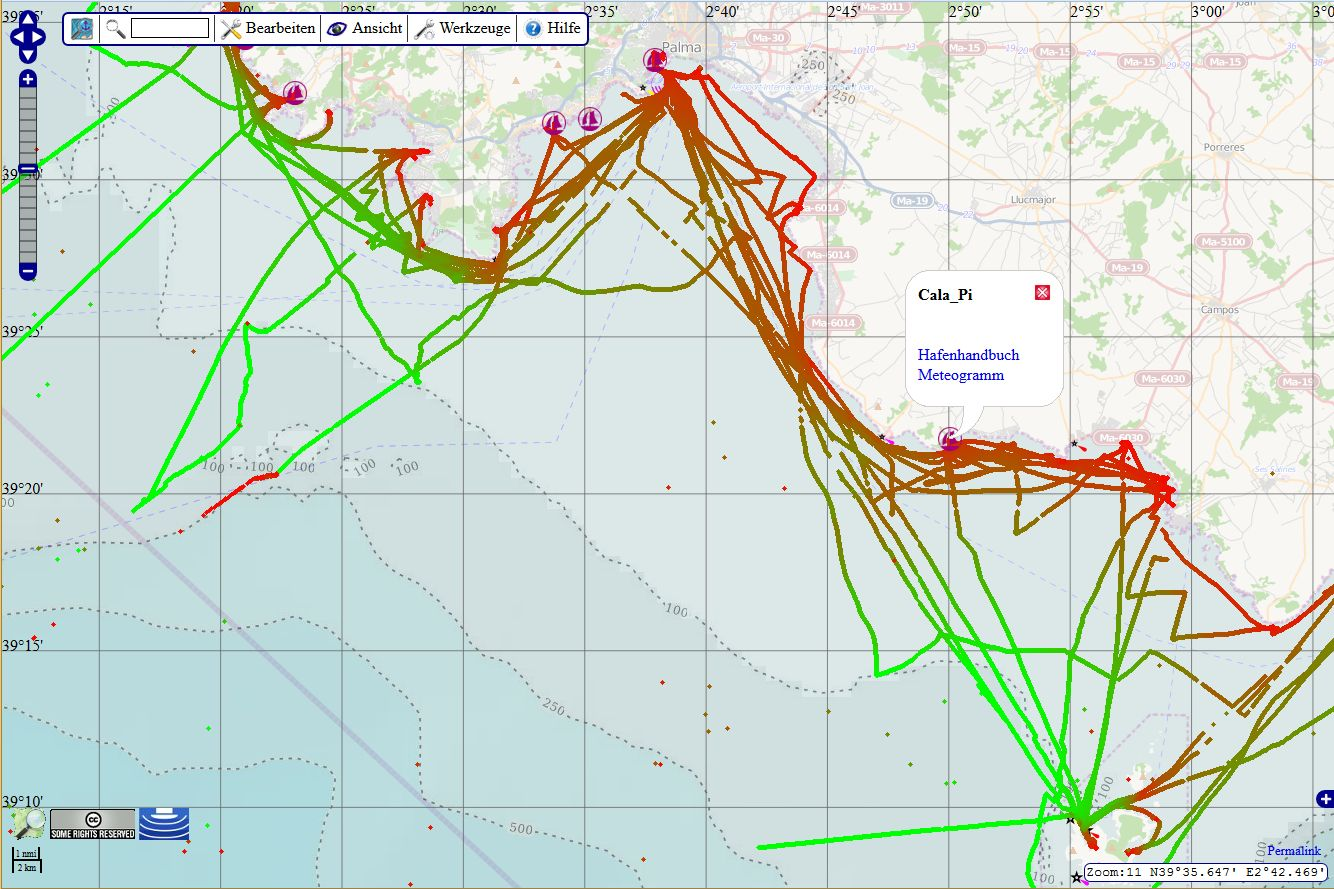
Depth tracks near Palma (ES)

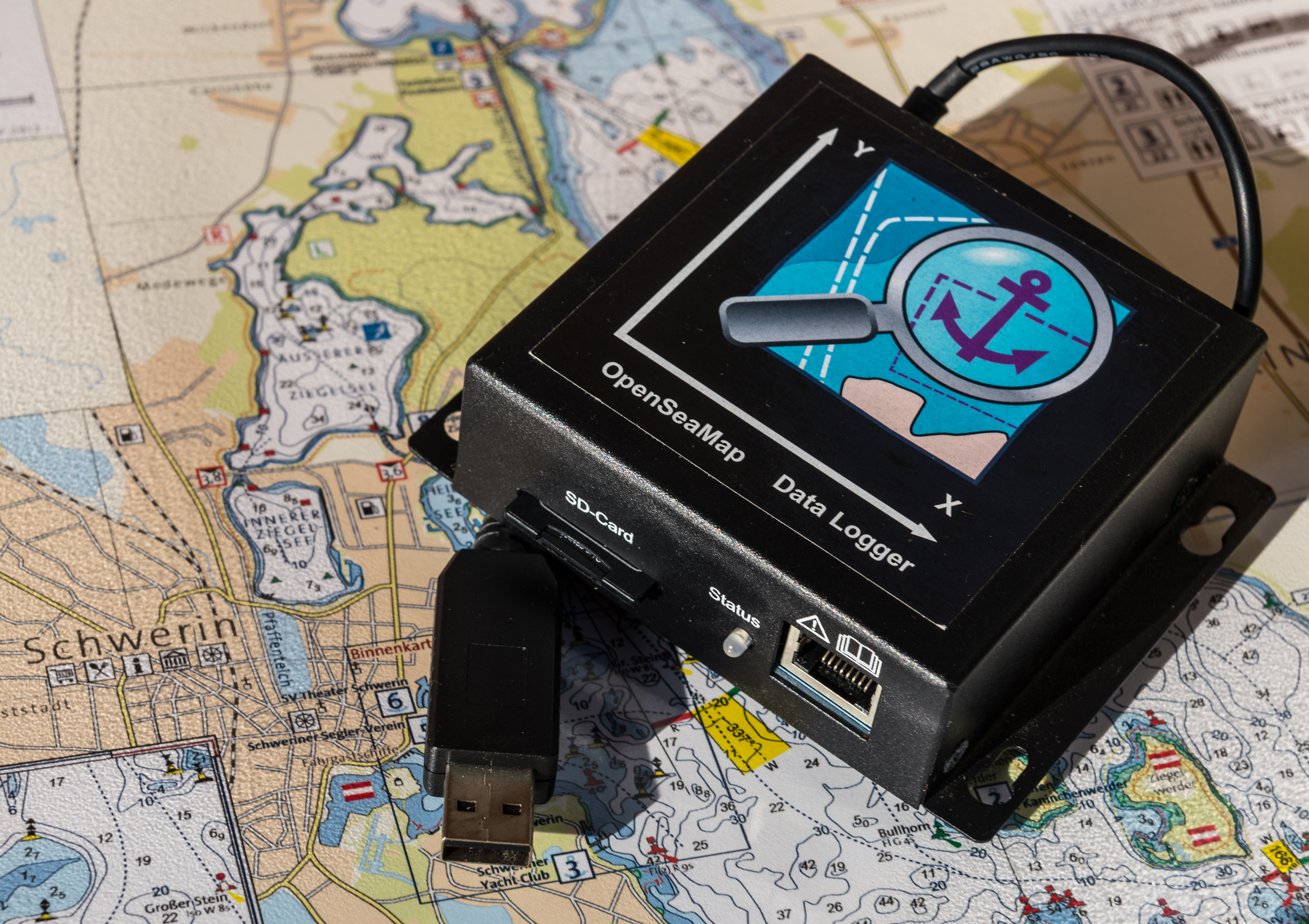
OpenSeaMap Data Logger

OpenSeaMap measures water depths by crowdsourcing. Sailors, motor boaters, divers, and fishermen can collect water depths between 0 and 100 m with sounder tools and GPS. Divers work with a dive computer. Coastal water, lakes and rivers are surveyed. Result will be an elevation model and derived depth lines. Uploaded tracks are shown in the chart. There is an ongoing discussion about how crowdsourcing can support and enrich the measuring system.

== Wikipedia articles on the map ==
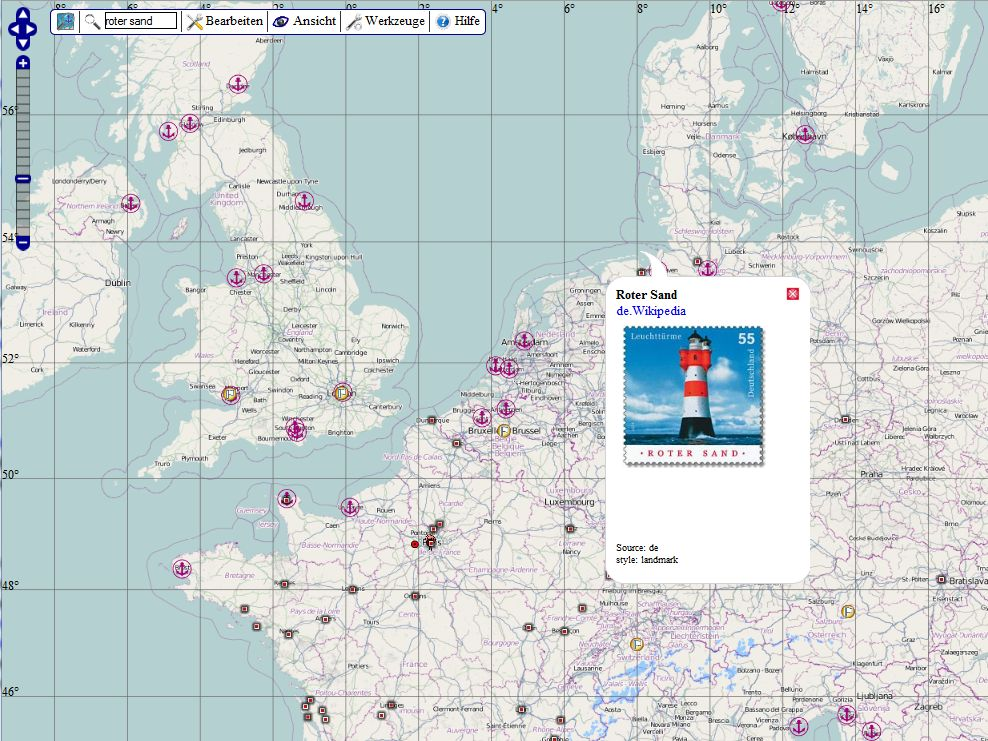
OpenSeaMap and Wikipedia

By "View Wikipedia-Links" OpenSeaMap displays all georeferenced Wikipedia articles worldwide as Icon, and optionally as gallery of all pictures from Commons. 1.7 million georeferenced articles are shown, in 41 languages, with 260,000 in German and 740,000 in English (as of September 2011). With mouseover, a popup is opened with title of the article and an informative picture. Clicking on the pop-up will get the responding Wikipedia article.

== See also ==
- OpenCPN
