= Trimble ASCII Interface Protocol =

The Trimble ASCII Interface Protocol is a digital communication interface which uses printable ASCII characters over a serial link. It is used to communicate with Global Positioning System receivers.

== See also ==
- NMEA 0183
- NMEA 2000
