= OpenCPN =

Open source maritime plotter

- Logo
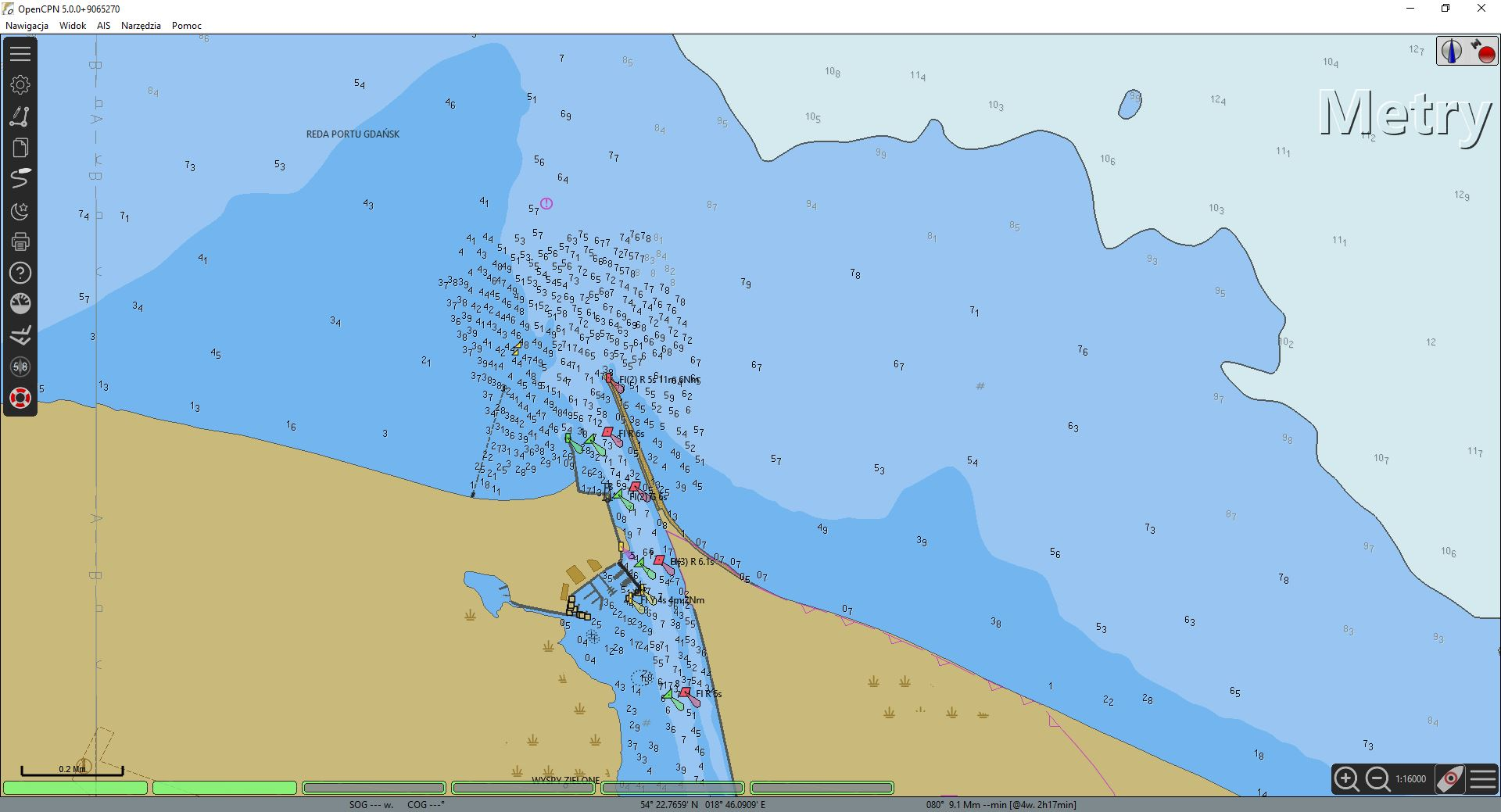
- Developer(s): The OpenCPN Authors
- Stable release: 5.12.2 / August 2, 2025
- Repository: github.com/OpenCPN/OpenCPN
- Written in: C, C++
- Operating system: Cross-platform
- Type: Chart plotter and navigation
- License: GPL v2
- Website: opencpn.org

OpenCPN (Open Chart Plotter Navigator) is a free software maritime chart plotter and navigation software for use underway or as a planning tool. Developed by a team of active sailors and tested in real world conditions, it has multiple supported chart formats and a variety of data inputs.

By using satellite navigation and other NMEA 0183 data feeds, OpenCPN determines a ship's own position and status from sensors such as AIS receivers to automatically plot and track the positions of ships in the neighborhood.

In 2017 Norwegian ENC charts were available for OpenCPN.

== See also ==
- OpenSeaMap
