= B&G =

- Company type: Privately Held; Owned by Navico
- Industry: Marine Electronics
- Founded: Lymington, England (1956)
- Headquarters: United Kingdom, United Kingdom
- Area served: Global
- Products: Zeus, Vulcan, WTP, H5000, Triton, ForwardScan Sonar, HALO Radar, VHF
- Website: www.bandg.com

B&G, formerly known as Brookes & Gatehouse, is a developer and manufacturer of instrumentation, autopilot and navigation systems for racing and cruising sailing yachts.

== History ==
The company was founded in 1956 by Major R.N. Gatehouse and Ronald Brookes who had formed a partnership the previous year to develop and manufacture a new radio direction finder (RDF) for use by private sailing boats.

Over the course of the 1950s, B&G, then based in Lymington, extended its activities into echo sounders and in 1960 produced its first speedometer.

The company has changed hands a number of times during and is now a brand of Navico, a Norwegian-based company in the marine electronics sector.

== See also ==
- Navico, parent company of B&G
- Simrad Yachting, another Navico brand
- Lowrance Electronics, another Navico brand
- C-MAP, another Navico brand
