= Simrad Optronics =

Norwegian defence equipment company

Rheinmetall Nordic
- Industry: Defence industry
- Headquarters: Nøtterøy, Norway
- Area served: Global
- Revenue: NOK 281 million (2023)
- Number of employees: 80 (2025)
- Website: www.rheinmetall.com/en/company/subsidiaries/rheinmetall-nordic

Simrad Optronics AS is the holding company of Simrad Optronics Group located in Nøtterøy, Norway. Simrad Optronics Group is a global niche supplier to the defence industry, with production facilities in Norway and Maine, United States. Daughter companies include Vinghøg AS at Nøtterøy, Norway and Vingtech Corporation in Maine, United States. The company was listed on Oslo Stock Exchange until July 2010. As of July 12, 2010 Rheinmetall AG is the company's sole shareholder; following a voluntary offer of May 12 to acquire all issued and outstanding shares in the company.

The company supplies products in four main product areas:

Remote Weapon Systems
CCD cameras, weapon integration, firing solenoids and lasers for remote weapon systems
Electro-optics
Advanced optoelectronics observation, laser and sight systems for various applications, including night vision
Weapon Improvement Products
Integration of a wide range of small - and medium caliber guns to vehicle and ground mounted system
Vehicle Systems
High-end observation and target acquisition systems for light and heavy military vehicles

There are today three companies using the Simrad brand:

- Simrad Optronics AS, as described in this article.
- Simrad commercial maritime applications (fish finding electronics as echo sounders, catch monitoring systems, trawl sonars etc.), made by Kongsberg Simrad now part of Kongsberg Maritime a division of Kongsberg Gruppen.
- Simrad consumer maritime applications (marine electronics as radars, navigation, autopilots etc.), made by Navico.

The reason for three different companies with different owners using the same brand name is the common history, as the name comes from the original SIMRAD company founded in Oslo, Norway in 1947, by Willy Christian Simonsen, making marine VHF radios and sonar application for the commercial fishery fleet. The name was an abbreviation of Simonsen Radio.
