= Willy Christian Simonsen =

Norwegian businessman

Willy Christian Simonsen (13 September 1913 – 4 December 2003) was a Norwegian engineer and business founder.

He was born in Kristiania as a son of chemist Einar Simonsen (1867–1918) and Alice Sophia Andersen (1877–1969). He finished his secondary education at Hegdehaugen School in 1933, and graduated in electrical engineering from the Dresden University of Technology in 1938. He worked as an engineer for Elektrisk Bureau and Chr. Michelsen Institute. During the German occupation of Norway from 1940 he was involved in the Norwegian resistance movement where he cooperated with fellow engineers Odd Dahl and Helmer H. Dahl to wiretap German forces. This was discovered and Simonsen was arrested by Gestapo, but admitted to Ullevål Hospital from which he escaped. He fled to the United Kingdom, where he started working in the Radio Production Unit of the British War Office. He developed the shortwave radio "Sweetheart".

He was hired as a technical consultant for the Norwegian High Command after the war. In 1947 he started the company Simonsen Radio in Oslo, and in 1957 the company Simonsen & Mustad followed in Horten. He received initial capital from Halfdan and John Mustad. The brand name Simrad became known in the communications business, and was leading in echo sounding equipment. He backed out of these companies in 1968 and started Simonsen Elektro (in Oslo) in 1970 and Simonsen Elektro Løkken (in Løkken Verk). These companies produced automatic cell phones, in the NMT 450 system, and were leading in the Norwegian market until the 1980s.

Simonsen was decorated with the Defence Medal 1940–1945, the UK Defence Medal, the Haakon VII 70th Anniversary Medal and the Order of St. Olav, and has received the Reginald Fessenden Award. He died in December 2003.

== See also ==
- Simrad Yachting
