= Stowe Marine =

- Industry: Manufacturing
- Founded: 1984

Stowe Marine is a developer and manufacturer of advanced instrumentation systems for racing and cruising sailing yachts. The company was founded in the 1970s and is now based in Lymington, England.

== Introduction ==
Stowe instruments can be found on many of the world's leading sailing yachts, such as Velsheda. Stowe is now based in Lymington on the south coast of England.

== History ==
The company was founded in the 1970s by Alan Cozens in a shed in his back garden in Rowlands Castle, Hampshire, England. The first product which proved very popular was the Trailing Log, a portable battery powered instrument that measures boat speed and distance run. Thousands of these early instruments are still in use today. Over the course of the 1980s and 1990s Stowe extended its activities into Integrated Instruments, Autopilots and Navigation Plotters. As a company Stowe has changed hands a number of times during its 25+ year lifetime, and is now a subsidiary of Tinley Electronics, the Lymington based marine electronics service company. Stowe however remains headquartered just a few miles from its birthplace.

== Products ==
Stowe produces integrated instrumentation systems that collect and analyse a wide range of data relating both to a yacht's performance and the external conditions in which it is sailing. This information can then be displayed to the helmsman, navigator and crew and/or analysed by integral data processing functions to produce additional information that enable the yacht's crew to make informed decisions with regard to performance optimisation and navigation strategy and tactics - particularly in a competitive environment.

Data that is collected may include apparent wind speed, apparent wind angle, boat speed, heading, position (Latitude/Longitude) and depth. By combining and analysing these inputs a Stowe system can calculate and display in real time information such as true wind speed, true wind direction, course over ground, velocity made good (VMG), time and distance to next waypoint, and much more. This data can additionally be fed into tactical navigation software running on a laptop computer and analysed against tidal and current databases, electronic charting and weather prediction feeds to enable the navigator to devise the fastest and most efficient route between two or more points. This information can also be fed into autopilot systems.

In 2009 the Stowe product range is centred on the Dataline GX system, with a wide range of configurations available for boats of all types and sizes.

== Timelines ==
1984 Navigator Range of instruments released putting Stowe on the map

1987 Micro Range Launched

1990 Dataline Integrated Instruments launched

1991 Stowe acquired by Robertson in Norway

1992 Stowe Autopilots launched

1994 Robertson acquired by Simrad Yachting

1996 Simrad acquired by Kongsberg Gruppen

2001 Stowe sold to AW Marine

2007 Stowe acquired by Tinley Electronics
