= Waypoint =

Point on a route of travel

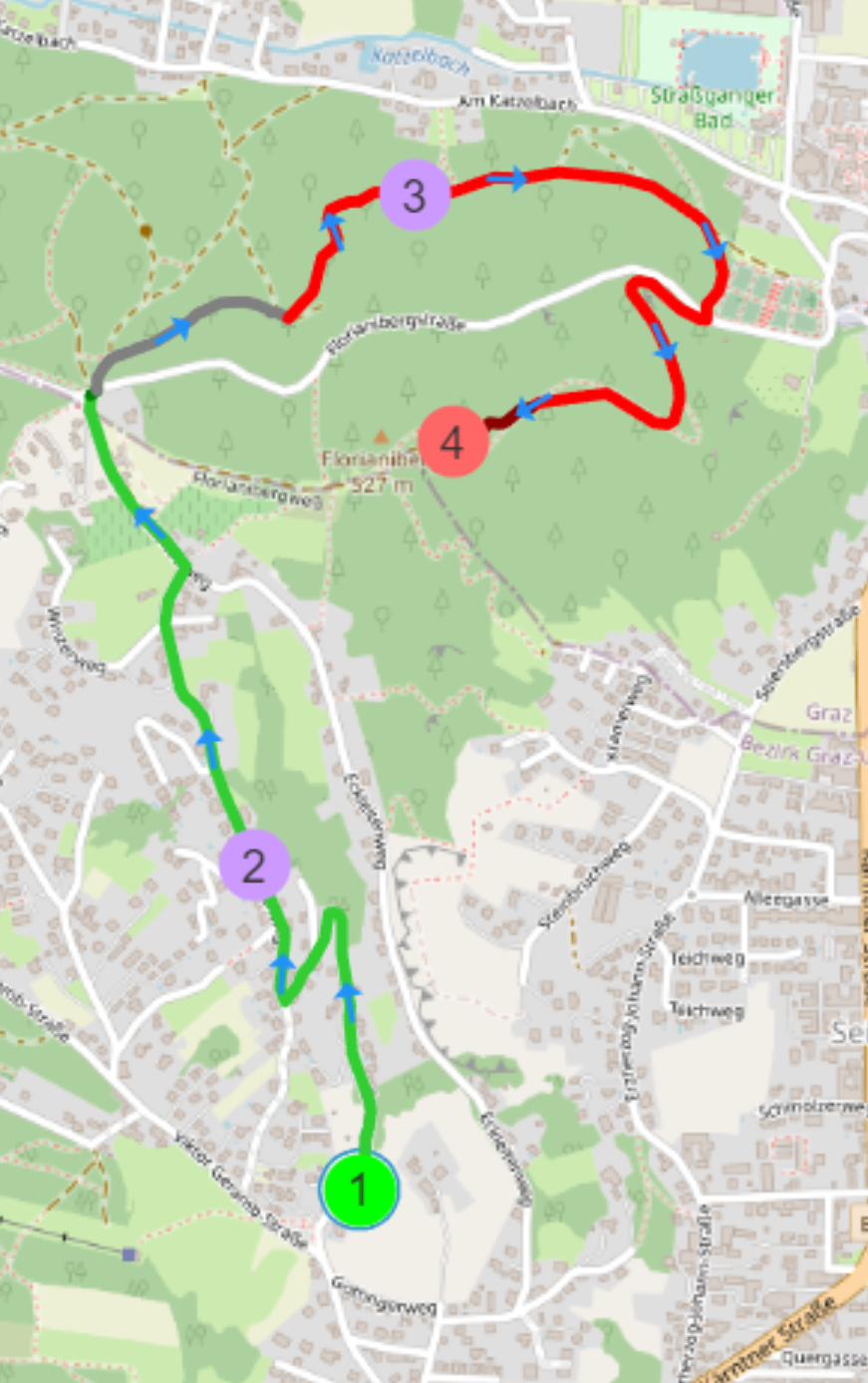
A walking route with a number of waypoints marked

A waypoint is a point or place on a route or line of travel, a stopping point, an intermediate point, or point at which course is changed, the first use of the term tracing to 1880. In modern terms, it most often refers to coordinates which specify one's position on the globe at the end of each "leg" (stage) of a journey.

Hence, the term connotes a reference point in physical space, most often associated with navigation. For example, in the case of sea navigation, a waypoint could mark the longitudinal and latitudinal coordinate or a GPS point in open water, a location near a known mapped shoal or other entity in a body of water, a point a fixed distance off of a geographical entity such as a lighthouse or harbor entrance, etc. In air navigation, waypoints most often consist of a series of abstract GPS points that create artificial airways—"highways in the sky"—created specifically for purposes of air navigation that have no clear connection to features of the real world.

== Concept ==
Waypoints are sets of coordinates that identify a point in physical space. Coordinates used can vary depending on the application. For terrestrial navigation these coordinates can include longitude and latitude. Air navigation also includes altitude. Waypoints have only become widespread for navigational use by the layman since the development of advanced navigational systems, such as the Global Positioning System (GPS) and certain other types of radio navigation. Waypoints located on the surface of the Earth are usually defined in two dimensions (e.g., longitude and latitude); those used in the Earth's atmosphere or in outer space are defined in at least three dimensions (four if time is one of the coordinates, as it might be for some waypoints outside the Earth).

Although the term waypoint has only entered common use in recent years, the equivalent of a waypoint in all but name has existed for as long as human beings have navigated. Waypoints have traditionally been associated with distinctive features of the real world, such as rock formations, springs, oases, mountains, buildings, roadways, waterways, railways, and so on. Today, these associations persist, but waypoints are more often associated with physical artifacts created specifically for navigation, such as radio beacons, buoys, satellites or control points.

In the modern world, waypoints are increasingly abstract, often having no obvious relationship to any distinctive features of the real world. These waypoints are used to help define invisible routing paths for navigation. For example, artificial airways "highways in the sky", created specifically for purposes of air navigation, often have no clear connection to features of the real world, and consist only of a series of abstract waypoints in the sky through which pilots navigate; these airways are designed to facilitate air traffic control and routing of traffic between heavily traveled locations, and do not reference natural terrain features. Abstract waypoints of this kind have been made practical by modern navigation technologies, such as land-based radio beacons and the satellite-based GPS.

Abstract waypoints typically have only specified longitude and latitude or UTM coordinates plus the reference datum, and often a name if they are marked on charts, and are located using a radio navigation system such as a VOR or GPS receiver. A waypoint can be a destination, a fix along a planned course used to make a journey, or simply a point of reference useful for navigation.

== Modern applications ==
=== With GPS ===
GPS systems are increasingly used to create and use waypoints in navigation of all kinds. A typical GPS receiver can locate a waypoint with an accuracy of three meters or better when used with land-based assisting technologies such as the Wide Area Augmentation System (WAAS). Waypoints can also be marked on a computer mapping program and uploaded to the GPS receiver, marked on the receiver's own internal map, or entered manually on the device as a pair of coordinates.

If the GPS receiver has track-logging capabilities, one can also define waypoints after the fact from where one has been. For example, marine GPS receivers often have a "man overboard" function, which instantly creates a waypoint in the receiver for the boat's position when enabled and then begins displaying the distance and course back to that position.

In GPS navigation, a "route" is usually defined as a series of two or more waypoints. To follow such a route, the GPS user navigates to the nearest waypoint, then to the next one in turn until the destination is reached. Most receivers have the ability to compute a great circle route towards a waypoint, enabling them to find the shortest route even over long distances, although waypoints are often so closely spaced that this is not a factor.

Many GPS receivers, both military and civilian, now offer integrated cartographic databases (also known as base maps), allowing users to locate a point on a map and define it as a waypoint. Some GPS systems intended for automobile navigation can generate a suggested driving route between two waypoints, based on the cartographic database. As one drives along the route, the system indicates the driver's current location and gives advance notice of upcoming turns. The best of these systems can take into account traffic restrictions such as one-way streets and intersections where left or right turns are prohibited when computing the suggested driving route.

Most GPS receivers allow the user to assign a name to each waypoint. Many models also let the user select a symbol or icon to identify the waypoint on a graphical map display from a built-in library of icons. These include standard map symbols for marine navigation aids such as buoys, marinas and anchorages, as well as land-based landmarks such as churches, bridges, shopping centers, parks and tunnels.

GPS receivers used in air navigation have databases which contain named waypoints, radio navigation aids, airports and heliports. These references comprise the National Airspace System's method of allowing air traffic to select routes that yield efficient point-to-point navigation. Waypoints are often used in the termination phase of a flight to its destination airport. Some GPS receivers are integrated into autopilot or flight management systems, to aid the pilot in control of an aircraft. Waypoints may be found on Aeronautical Charts known as Instrument Flight Rules Enroute Low Altitude Charts, Terminal Arrival Procedures or Sectional Charts.

=== Without GPS ===
Although the concept of waypoints has been greatly popularized among non-specialists by the development of the GPS, waypoints can be used with other navigational aids. A notable example is the worldwide use, in orienteering sports, of waypoints with a map that omits a coordinate system, known as control points.

In aerial celestial navigation, waypoints are precomputed along an aircraft's great circle route to divide the flight into rhumb lines and allow celestial fixes to be more rapidly taken using the precomputed intercept method.

In air navigation, waypoints are sometimes defined as intersections between two VOR radials or NDB bearings, or in terms of specific distances and headings towards or away from a radio beacon. For visual air navigation (see the article on visual flight rules), waypoints may be directly associated with distinctive features on the ground that are easily identifiable from aircraft, such as stadiums, power plants, racetracks, etc. Temporary waypoints are sometimes defined as traffic requires, e.g., air-traffic controllers may instruct a pilot to reference a terrain feature at "your ten o'clock position, two miles."

== In aviation ==
In aviation, area navigation (RNAV)—a method of navigation that permits aircraft operation on any desired flight path within the coverage of station-referenced navigation aids or within the limits of the capability of self-contained aids, or a combination of these—relies heavily upon waypoints. RNAV is increasingly used as the primary method of navigation for aircraft.

In the RNAV context, a waypoint is a predetermined geographical position that is defined in terms of latitude/longitude coordinates (altitude is ignored). Waypoints may be a simple named point in space or may be associated with existing navigational aids, intersections, or fixes. A waypoint is most often used to indicate a change in direction, speed, or altitude along the desired path.

Aviation RNAV procedures make use of both fly-over and fly-by waypoints. A fly-over waypoint is a waypoint that must be crossed vertically by an aircraft. A fly-by waypoint is a waypoint that marks the intersection of two straight paths, with the transition from one path to another being made by the aircraft using a precisely calculated turn that "flies by" but does not vertically cross the waypoint.

Waypoints used in aviation are given five-letter names. These names are meant to be pronounceable or have a mnemonic value, so that they may easily be conveyed by voice. In some cases the names correspond to a notable feature or landmark in the area (for example, a waypoint near Newton, Iowa, has the name "MATAG"; Newton was where appliance manufacturer Maytag was founded). The waypoint names might not be unique globally.

== See also ==
- Airway (aviation)
- Autopilot
- Geo (microformat)
- Geotagging
- Global Positioning System
- GPS Phone
- GPX (GPS eXchange Format); XML schema for interchange of waypoints
- GSM localization
- Instrument flight rules
- Point of interest
- Visual flight rules
- Wayfinding
