= GPSBabel =

Software for converting GPS data

- Original author: Robert Lipe
- Developers: Robert Lipe and community
- Initial release: October 2, 2002; 23 years ago
- Stable release: 1.10.0 / 23 December 2024; 12 months ago
- Repository: github.com/gpsbabel/gpsbabel
- Written in: C++, C
- Operating system: Cross-platform
- Type: GPS
- License: GPL
- Website: www.gpsbabel.org

GPSBabel is a cross-platform, free software to transfer routes, tracks, and waypoint data to and from consumer GPS units, and to convert between GPS data formats. It has a command-line interface and a graphical interface for Windows, macOS, and Linux users.

GPSBabel is part of many Linux distributions including Debian and Fedora, and also part of the Fink and Homebrew systems for getting Unix software on macOS.

== Applications ==
Many contributors to OpenStreetMap use GPSBabel to convert GPS track data from proprietary formats to the GPX format OpenStreetMap requires.

GPSBabel is popular in the Geocaching community because it enables people with incompatible GPS units to share data.

Geographic information system (GIS) applications such as QGIS and Grass use GPSBabel for many import and export operations and processing.

Photographers frequently use GPSBabel for geotagging images, associating location with photographs. This relies on GPS data loggers, either external or internal to the camera.

GPSBabel enables owners of many different brands of GPS units to view their GPS data in several popular consumer map programs, such as Google Earth and Microsoft Streets & Trips.
