= Training Center XML =

Data exchange format

Training Center XML (TCX) is a data exchange format introduced in 2007 as part of Garmin's Training Center product. The XML is similar to GPX since it exchanges GPS tracks, but treats a track as an Activity rather than simply a series of GPS points. TCX provides standards for transferring heart rate, running cadence, bicycle cadence, calories in the detailed track. It also provides summary data in the form of laps.

Its Internet media type is application/vnd.garmin.tcx+xml for php the media type is application/octet-stream
