= IEC 61162 =

Standard for maritime navigation equipment interfaces

IEC 61162 is a collection of IEC standards for "Digital interfaces for navigational equipment within a ship".

The 61162 standards are developed in Working Group 6 (WG6) of Technical Committee 80 (TC80) of the IEC.

== Sections of IEC 61162 ==
Standard IEC 61162 is divided into the following parts:

- Part 1: Single talker and multiple listeners (Also known as NMEA 0183)
- Part 2: Single talker and multiple listeners, high-speed transmission
- Part 3: Serial data instrument network (Also known as NMEA 2000)
- Part 450: Multiple talkers and multiple listeners–Ethernet interconnection (Also known as Lightweight Ethernet)
- Part 460: Multiple talkers and multiple listeners - Ethernet interconnection - Safety and security

The 61162 standards are all concerning the transport of NMEA sentences, but the IEC does not define any of these. This is left to the NMEA Organization.

== IEC 61162-1 ==
Single talker and multiple listeners.

== IEC 61162-2 ==
Single talker and multiple listeners, high-speed transmission.

== IEC 61162-3 ==
Serial data instrument network, multiple talker-multiple listener, prioritized data.

== IEC 61162-450 ==
Multiple talkers and multiple listeners.

This subgroup of TC80/WG6 has specified the use of Ethernet for shipboard navigational networks. The specification describes the transport of NMEA sentences as defined in 61162-1 over IPv4. Due to the low amount of protocol complexity it has been nicknamed Lightweight Ethernet or LWE in short.

There are three revision: the original published in 2011, and updates in 2018 and 2024.

== IEC 61162-450/460 ==
IEC 61162-460:2015(E) is an add-on to the IEC 61162-450 standard. This standard extends the informative guidance given in Annex D of IEC 61162-450:2011. The first edition was published in August 2015.

State May 2016 is the first bridge and system manufacturers beginning with the implementation of IEC 61162-450 and IEC 61162-460.

IEC 61162-460:2024 (also referred to as IEC 61162-460 Edition 3.0) is an updated add-on to IEC 61162-450. This standard extends the informative guidance given in Annex D of IEC 61162-450:2011. The third edition was published in April 2024.

Known devices with -450 implementation:

- AMI Marine X2 VDR
- Cobham SAILOR AIS
- Cobham SAILOR GNSS
- Cobham SAILOR NAVTEX
- Cobham SAILOR 7222 VHF DSC Class A
- Danelec VDR
- Furuno GPS
- Furuno ECDIS
- Furuno VDR
- Ixblue ECDIS
- Ixblue Netans (Full Naval Data Distribution solution)
- Navmaster ECDIS
- Netwave NW6000 SOLAS Voyage Data Recorder (VDR)
- Saab AIS
- Totem Plus ECDIS
- Totem Plus VDR 2014
- Veinland NMEA Matrix ( bidirectional 8 Port Multiplexer / Converter )
- Inclinometer
- SATURN Gyrocompass
- Norwegian Electric Systems RAVEN INS
- Weidmueller modular I/O system u-remote
- RH Marine ECDIS

Known devices/systems with -460 implementation:

- Robustel MG460 Maritime Cyber Security Gateway ( IEC 61162-460:2024 Gateway/Wireless-Gateway)
- Veinland marine approved network switch MagicNet ( IEC 61162-460 Switch/Forwarder)
- Veinland marine approved network gateway MagicNet-GWR (IEC 61162-460 Gateway)
- Chartworld eChart Secure (IEC 61162-460 Gateway)
