= NMEA 0183 =

Communication standard for marine electronics

NMEA 0183 is a combined electrical and data specification for communication between marine electronics such as echo sounder, sonars, anemometer, gyrocompass, autopilot, GPS receivers and many other types of instruments. It has been defined and is controlled by the National Marine Electronics Association (NMEA). It replaces the earlier NMEA 0180 and NMEA 0182 standards. In leisure marine applications, it is slowly being phased out in favor of the newer NMEA 2000 standard, though NMEA 0183 remains the norm in commercial shipping.

== Overview ==
The electrical standard that is used is EIA-422, also known as RS-422, although most hardware with NMEA-0183 outputs are also able to drive a single EIA-232 port. The standard calls for optically isolated inputs. There is no requirement for isolation for the outputs.

The NMEA 0183 standard uses a simple ASCII, serial communications protocol that defines how data are transmitted in a "sentence" from one "talker" to multiple "listeners" at a time. Through the use of intermediate expanders, a talker can have a unidirectional conversation with a nearly unlimited number of listeners, and using multiplexers, multiple sensors can talk to a single computer port.

At the application layer, the standard also defines the contents of each sentence (message) type, so that all listeners can parse messages accurately.

While NMEA 0183 only defines an RS-422 transport, there also exists a de facto standard in which the sentences from NMEA 0183 are placed in UDP datagrams (one sentence per packet) and sent over an IP network.

The NMEA standard is proprietary and sells for at least US$2000 (except for members of the NMEA) as of September 2020. However, much of it has been reverse-engineered from public sources.

=== UART settings ===
Typical Baud rate	4800
Data bits	8
Parity	None
Stop bits	1
Handshake	None

There is a variation of the standard called NMEA-0183HS that specifies a baud rate of 38,400. This is in general use by AIS devices.

== Message structure ==
- All transmitted data are printable ASCII characters between 0x20 (space) to 0x7e (~)
- Data characters are all the above characters except the reserved characters (See next line)
- Reserved characters are used by NMEA0183 for the following uses:

ASCII	Hex	Dec	Use
<CR>	0x0d	13	Carriage return
<LF>	0x0a	10	Line feed, end delimiter
!	0x21	33	Start of encapsulation sentence delimiter
$	0x24	36	Start delimiter
*	0x2a	42	Checksum delimiter
,	0x2c	44	Field delimiter
\	0x5c	92	TAG block delimiter
^	0x5e	94	Code delimiter for HEX representation of ISO/IEC 8859-1 (ASCII) characters
~	0x7e	126	Reserved

- Messages have a maximum length of 82 characters, including the $ or ! starting character and the ending <LF>
- The start character for each message can be either a $ (For conventional field delimited messages) or ! (for messages that have special encapsulation in them)
- The next five characters identify the talker (two characters) and the type of message (three characters).
- All data fields that follow are comma-delimited.
- Where data is unavailable, the corresponding field remains blank (it contains no character before the next delimiter – see Sample file section below).
- The first character that immediately follows the last data field character is an asterisk, but it is only included if a checksum is supplied.
- The asterisk is immediately followed by a checksum represented as a two-digit hexadecimal number. The checksum is the bitwise exclusive OR of ASCII codes of all characters between the $ and *, not inclusive. According to the official specification, the checksum is optional for most data sentences, but is compulsory for RMA, RMB, and RMC (among others).
- <CR><LF> ends the message.

As an example, a waypoint arrival alarm has the form:

$GPAAM,A,A,0.10,N,WPTNME*32

Another example for AIS messages is:

!AIVDM,1,1,,A,14eG;o@034o8sd<L9i:a;WF>062D,0*7D

== NMEA sentence format ==
NMEA is originally designed for a shipboard multi-drop network. The only way for equipment to know the author of a message is through the talker ID.

=== GNSS ===
GNSS receivers may use the following talker IDs, depending on the specific system in use:

- BD or GB - Beidou (BDS)
- GA - Galileo
- GI - NavIC (IRNSS)
- GL - GLONASS
- GP - GPS
- GQ - QZSS

NMEA message originating from a GNSS receiver mainly include the following "sentences" in the NMEA message:

Sentence	Description
$Talker ID+GGA	Global Positioning System Fixed Data (time, 3D position, HDOP)
$Talker ID+GLL	Geographic Position—Latitude and Longitude
$Talker ID+GSA	GNSS DOP, active satellites, and 2D/3D mode
$Talker ID+GSV	GNSS satellites in view
$Talker ID+RMC	Recommended minimum specific GPS data (time, 2D position, ground speed and course, date)
$Talker ID+VTG	Course over ground and ground speed

For example, the sentence for Global Positioning System Fixed Data for GPS should be "$GPGGA".

=== Vendor extensions ===
Most GPS manufacturers include special messages in addition to the standard NMEA set in their products for maintenance and diagnostics purposes. Extended messages begin with "$P" (for "private"). These extended messages are not standardized.

== Sample file ==
NMEA conversations are common stored as an ASCII text file to record location data. The following is a sample file produced by a Tripmate 850 GPS logger. This file was produced in Leixlip, County Kildare, Ireland. The record lasts two seconds.

$GPGGA,092750.000,5321.6802,N,00630.3372,W,1,8,1.03,61.7,M,55.2,M,,*76
$GPGSA,A,3,10,07,05,02,29,04,08,13,,,,,1.72,1.03,1.38*0A
$GPGSV,3,1,11,10,63,137,17,07,61,098,15,05,59,290,20,08,54,157,30*70
$GPGSV,3,2,11,02,39,223,19,13,28,070,17,26,23,252,,04,14,186,14*79
$GPGSV,3,3,11,29,09,301,24,16,09,020,,36,,,*76
$GPRMC,092750.000,A,5321.6802,N,00630.3372,W,0.02,31.66,280511,,,A*43
$GPGGA,092751.000,5321.6802,N,00630.3371,W,1,8,1.03,61.7,M,55.3,M,,*75
$GPGSA,A,3,10,07,05,02,29,04,08,13,,,,,1.72,1.03,1.38*0A
$GPGSV,3,1,11,10,63,137,17,07,61,098,15,05,59,290,20,08,54,157,30*70
$GPGSV,3,2,11,02,39,223,16,13,28,070,17,26,23,252,,04,14,186,15*77
$GPGSV,3,3,11,29,09,301,24,16,09,020,,36,,,*76
$GPRMC,092751.000,A,5321.6802,N,00630.3371,W,0.06,31.66,280511,,,A*45

The first lines translate as:

- GGA: UTC Time 09:27:50, location 53°21.6802′N 6°30.3372′W. Valid GPS fix using 8 satellites, HDOP = 1.02. Altitude = 61.7 meters MSL, geode-to-ellipsoid distance is 55.2 meters.
- GSA: Device set to 2D/3D automatic mode and is using 3D fix. Satellites used are 10,07,05,02,29,04,08,13. PDOP 1.72, HDOP = 1.03, VDOP = 1.38.
- GSV: (satellite data omitted)
- RMC: UTC Time 09:27:50, location 53°21.6802′N 6°30.3372′W. Speed over ground 0.02 knots, course over ground 31.66°. Date is 28 May 2011.

Note some blank fields, for example:

- GSV records, which describe satellites 'visible', lack the SNR (signal–to–noise ratio) field for satellite 16 and all data for satellite 36.
- GSA record, which lists satellites used for determining a fix (position) and gives a DOP of the fix, contains 12 fields for satellites' numbers, but only 8 satellites were taken into account—so 4 fields remain blank.

== Software compatibility ==
NMEA 0183 is supported by various navigation and mapping software. Notable applications include:

- Infrakit SURVEY
- DeLorme Street Atlas
- ESRI
- Google Earth
- Google Maps Mobile Edition
- gpsd - Unix GPS Daemon
- JOSM - OpenStreetMap Map Editor
- MapKing
- Microsoft MapPoint
- Microsoft Streets & Trips
- NetStumbler
- OpenCPN - Open source navigation software
- Signal K - Open source marine data aggregator
- OpenBSD's hw.sensors framework with the nmea(4) pseudo-device driver
- OpenNTPD through sysctl hw.sensors § timedelta API
- Rand McNally StreetFinder
- ObserVIEW
- QGIS

== Revisions ==
NMEA 0183 continued to be maintained separately: V4.10 was published in early May 2012, and an erratum noted on 12 May 2012. On November 27, 2018, it was issued an update to version 4.11, which supports Global Navigation Satellite Systems other than GPS. As of December 2023, NMEA has published the version 4.30 which replaces Version 4.11 and includes updates to the entire suite of GNSS sentences with significant interface updates for the use of GPS, GLONASS, GALILEO, BDS, QZSS, and NavIC/IRNSS satellite systems.

History of NMEA 0183 Versions
Ver.	Year	Changes	Refs
1.??	1983	Initial release	
2.00	1992	Migrate from RS-232 to RS-422	
2.01	1994		
2.10	1995		
2.20	1997		
2.30	1998		
3.00	2000		
3.01	2002		
4.00	2008		
4.10	2012		
4.11	2018		
4.30	2023		

History of NMEA 0183-HS Versions
Ver.	Year	Changes	Refs
1.00	2000	Initial release of 38.4K baud, known as "high speed"	
1.01	2012		

== See also ==
- GPS Exchange Format
- TransducerML
- IEEE 1451
- IEC 61162
- NMEA 2000
- NMEA OneNet
- RTCM SC-104
- RINEX
