= IEC metric screw sized connectors =

Series of electrical connectors

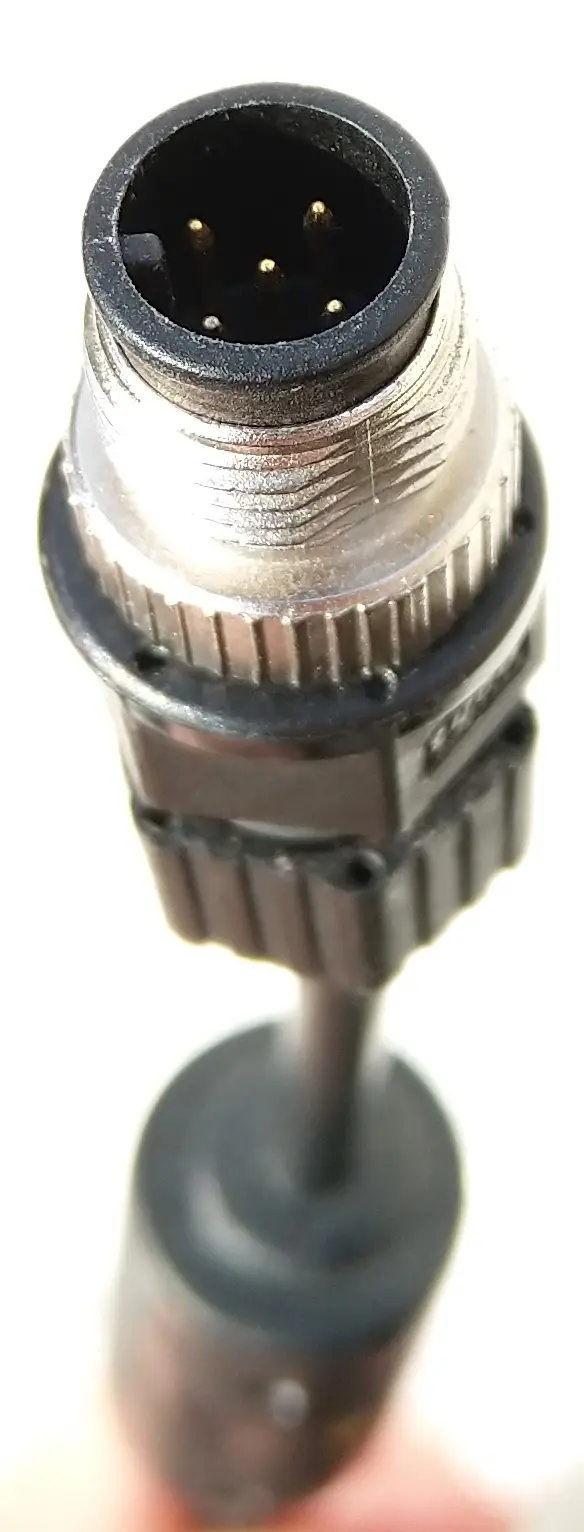
M12 A-coded 5-pin connector.

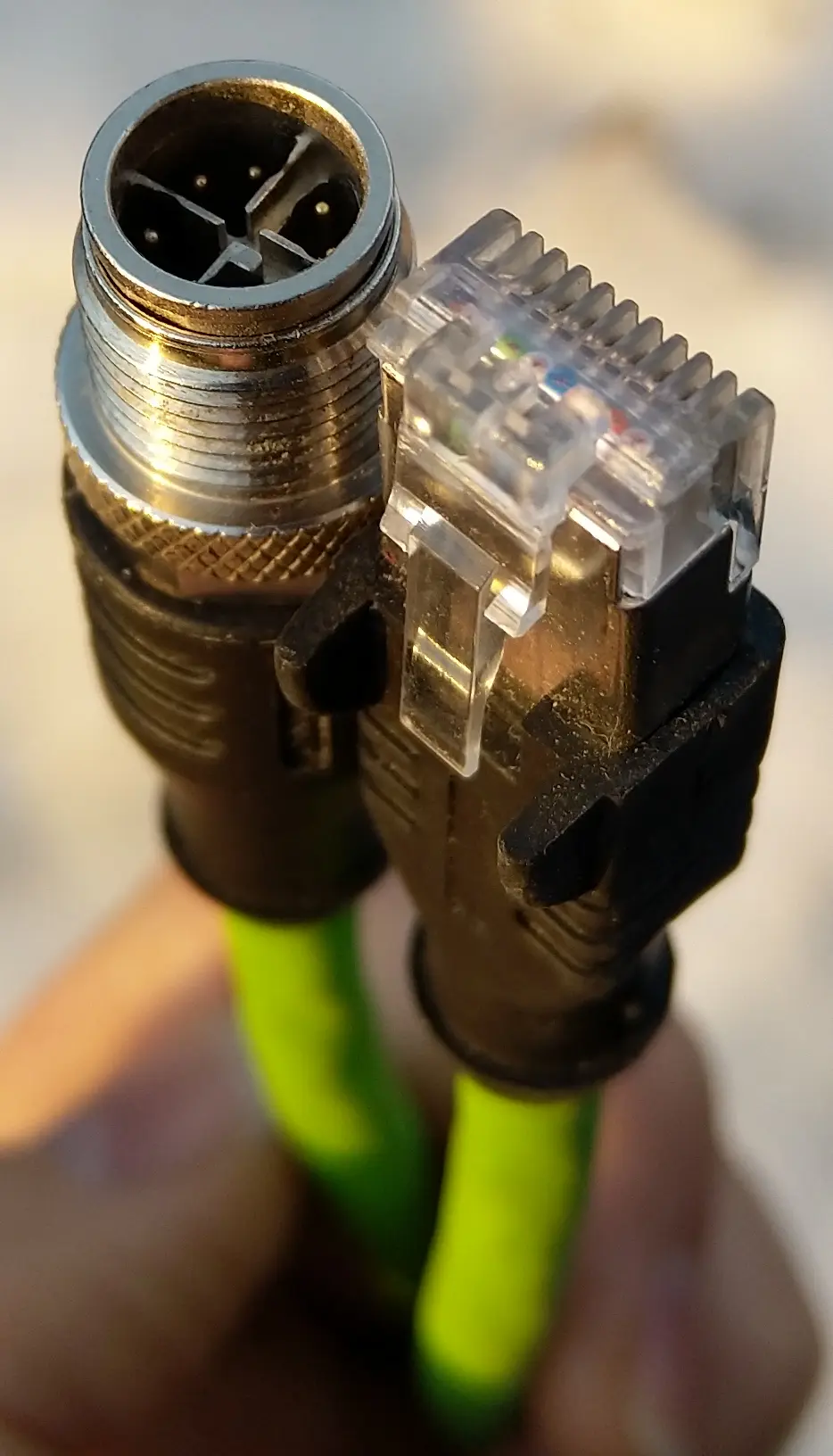
Ethernet cable with an M12 X-coded connector on one end and a modular connector on the other.

IEC metric screw sized connectors is a family of electrical connectors defined by IEC that are named according to their ISO metric screw thread, namely M5, M8 and M12. The number gives their outer screw thread diameter in millimeters as with the identically named screws. However, the connectors are further classified by a so-called coding, denoted by one or more letters, which defines things like pin layout, shape of connecting surfaces and electrical properties.

The many types are partly to prevent incorrect connection. The larger connector sizes are the most varied, with designated connectors ranging from analog and digital signals to AC and DC power.

Each "coding" has a different keyway that prevents incorrect connection between incompatibly keyed connectors.

The connectors on the ends of cables have a freely rotating screw threads that are turned to screw the plug into its mating socket, while the connectors attached to equipment have fixed screw threads that do not rotate. This means two panel-mount connectors will not fit together as they cannot be screwed in, however two cables are able to be joined together. The gender does not affect this arrangement - both male and female panel-mount connectors are fixed, and both male and female cable ends have freely rotating screw threads.

Major uses include factory automation and transportation. Products can be designed for high weather and chemical resistance (high IP rating) as well as mechanical durability.

== Standard listing ==
- IEC 61076-2-101 M12 connectors with screw-locking: M12 A, B, C, D and P-coding
- IEC 61076-2-104 M8 connectors with screw-locking or snap-locking: M8 A and B-coding
- IEC 61076-2-105 M5 connectors with screw-locking: M5 (only A-coding defined)
- IEC 61076-2-109 M12 connectors with screw-locking for data transmission frequencies up to 500 MHz: M12 X and H-coding
- IEC 61076-2-111 M12 power connectors with screw-locking: M12 E, F, K, L, M, S, T-coding
- IEC 61076-2-113 M12 connectors with screw-locking, power and signal contacts for data transmission frequencies up to 100 MHz: M12 Y-coding
- IEC 61076-2-114 M8 connectors with screw-locking, power and signal contacts for data transmission frequencies up to 100 MHz: M8 D and P-coding
- IEC 61754-27 M12-FO (fiber optic)

== Variants ==
All variants permit one or more pins to be removed to create differently keyed connectors. For example any pin in a 6-pin connector could be removed, to make six different, incompatible 5-pin connectors.

M5
Coding	Pins	Diagram	Uses
A	3		Signal
A	4		Signal

M8
Coding	Pins	Diagram	Current rating	Voltage rating	Uses
A	3		3 A	60 Vac/dc	Signal, Ethernet
A	4		3 A	30 Vac/dc	Signal, Ethernet
A	6		1 A	30 Vac/dc	Signal, Ethernet
A	8		1 A	30 Vac/dc	Signal, Ethernet
B	5		3 A	30 Vac/dc	DeviceNet
C	12				
D	4				Profinet
P	4				

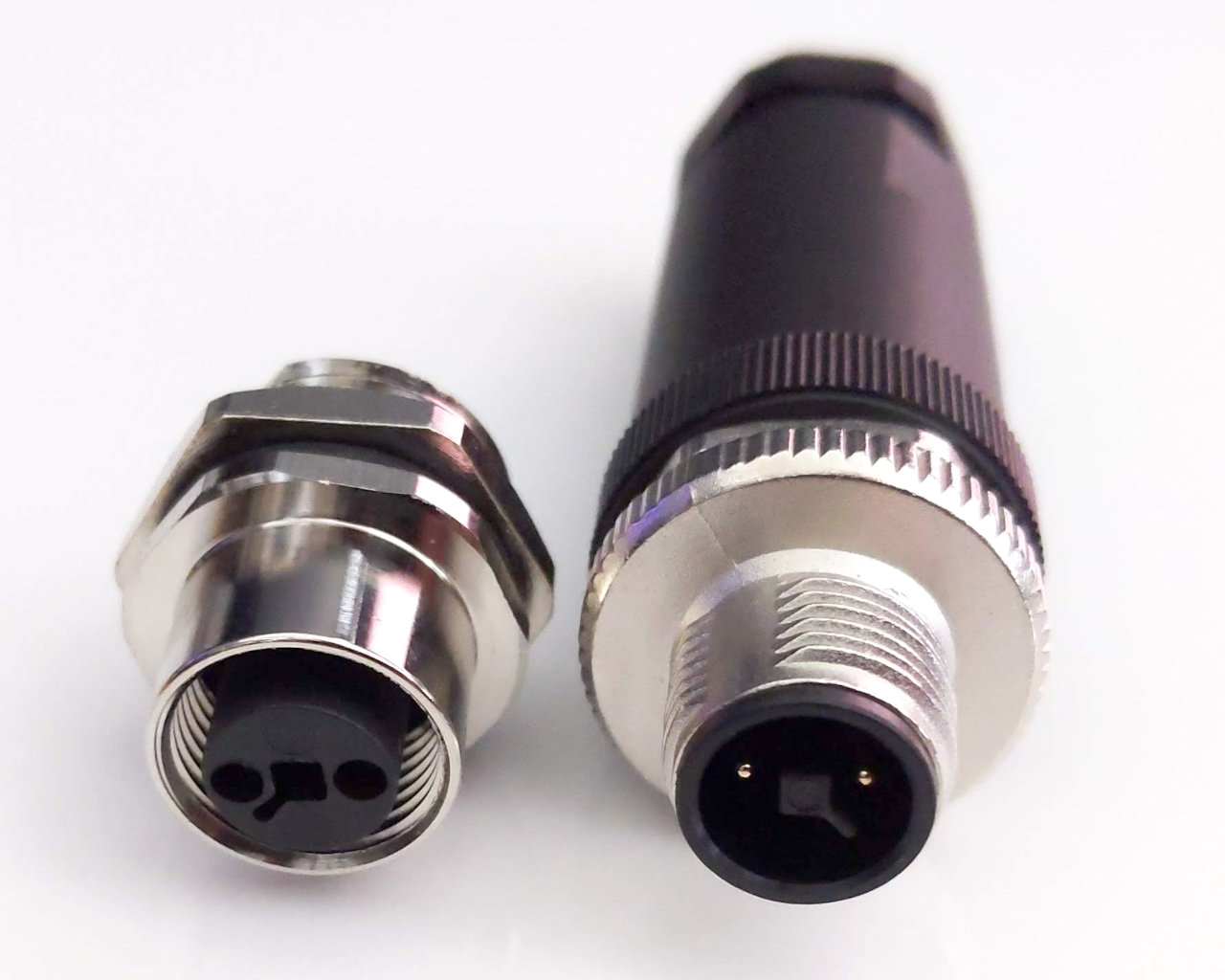
M12 T-coded 2-pin connectors. Left, panel mount female socket. Right, inline male plug. The screw thread on the inline connectors can be freely moved regardless of gender, while the threads on the panel mount connectors are always fixed.

M12
Coding	Pins	Diagram	Current rating	Voltage rating	Uses
A	2		4 A	250 Vac/dc	DC power, sensors, actuators, 1 Gb/s Ethernet; CANopen, DeviceNet, Profibus PA
A	3		4 A	250 Vac/dc	DC power, sensors, actuators, 1 Gb/s Ethernet; CANopen, DeviceNet, Profibus PA
A	4		4 A	250 Vac/dc	DC power, sensors, actuators, 1 Gb/s Ethernet; CANopen, DeviceNet, Profibus PA
A	5		2 A	60 Vac/dc	DC power, sensors, actuators, 1 Gb/s Ethernet; CANopen, DeviceNet, Profibus PA
A	6		2 A	30 Vac/dc	DC power, sensors, actuators, 1 Gb/s Ethernet; CANopen, DeviceNet, Profibus PA
A	7		2 A	30 Vac/dc	DC power, sensors, actuators, 1 Gb/s Ethernet; CANopen, DeviceNet, Profibus PA
A	8		2 A	30 Vac/dc	DC power, sensors, actuators, 1 Gb/s Ethernet; CANopen, DeviceNet, Profibus PA
A	9		1.5 A	30 Vac/dc	DC power, sensors, actuators, 1 Gb/s Ethernet; CANopen, DeviceNet, Profibus PA
A	10		1.5 A	30 Vac/dc	DC power, sensors, actuators, 1 Gb/s Ethernet; CANopen, DeviceNet, Profibus PA
A	11		1.5 A	30 Vac/dc	DC power, sensors, actuators, 1 Gb/s Ethernet; CANopen, DeviceNet, Profibus PA
A	12		1.5 A	30 Vac/dc	DC power, sensors, actuators, 1 Gb/s Ethernet; CANopen, DeviceNet, Profibus PA
A	13		1.5 A	30 Vac/dc	DC power, sensors, actuators, 1 Gb/s Ethernet; CANopen, DeviceNet, Profibus PA
A	14		1.5 A	30 Vac/dc	DC power, sensors, actuators, 1 Gb/s Ethernet; CANopen, DeviceNet, Profibus PA
A	15		1.5 A	30 Vac/dc	DC power, sensors, actuators, 1 Gb/s Ethernet; CANopen, DeviceNet, Profibus PA
A	16		1.5 A	30 Vac/dc	DC power, sensors, actuators, 1 Gb/s Ethernet; CANopen, DeviceNet, Profibus PA
A	17		1.5 A	30 Vac/dc	DC power, sensors, actuators, 1 Gb/s Ethernet; CANopen, DeviceNet, Profibus PA
B	5		2 A	60 Vac/dc	Non-Ethernet Fieldbus connections, commonly Profibus DP
C	3				AC power, including motor connections
C	4				AC power, including motor connections
C	5				AC power, including motor connections
C	6				AC power, including motor connections
D	4		4 A	250 Vac/dc	Industrial Ethernet protocols such as Profinet and EtherNet/IP; only Fast Ethernet (100 Mb/s) because of its two wire pairs.
E	2 + FE				
E	3 + FE				
E	4 + FE				
F	2				DC power
F	3				DC power
F	4				DC power
FO	2 optical + 2 electric				
H	8		-	-	
K	2 + PE		16 A	600 Vac	AC power (single phase)
K	3 + PE		16 A	600 Vac	AC power (3-phase delta)
K	4 + PE		16 A	600 Vac	AC power (3-phase wye)
L	2		12 A 16 A	63 Vdc	DC power
L	2 + FE		12 A 16 A	63 Vdc	DC power
L	3		12 A 16 A	63 Vdc	DC power
L	3 + FE		12 A 16 A	63 Vdc	DC power
L	4		12 A 16 A	63 Vdc	DC power
L	4 + FE		12 A 16 A	63 Vdc	DC power
M	2 + PE		8 A	600 Vac	AC power (single phase)
M	3 + PE		8 A	600 Vac	AC power (3-phase)
M	4 + PE		8 A	600 Vac	AC power (3-phase delta)
M	5 + PE		8 A	600 Vac	3-phase motor + auxiliary wire pair
P	4 + PE				AC power (three phase)
S	2 + PE		12 A	300 Vac	AC power (single phase)
S	3 + PE		12 A	600 Vac	AC power (3-phase delta)
T	2		12 A	60 Vdc	DC power
T	3		12 A	60 Vdc	DC power
T	4		12 A	60 Vdc	DC power
X	8		-	-	10 Gb/s Ethernet
Y	8				Power + 100 Mb/s Ethernet
