= Chartplotter =

Marine navigation device

A chartplotter is a device used in marine navigation that integrates GPS data with an electronic navigational chart (ENC).

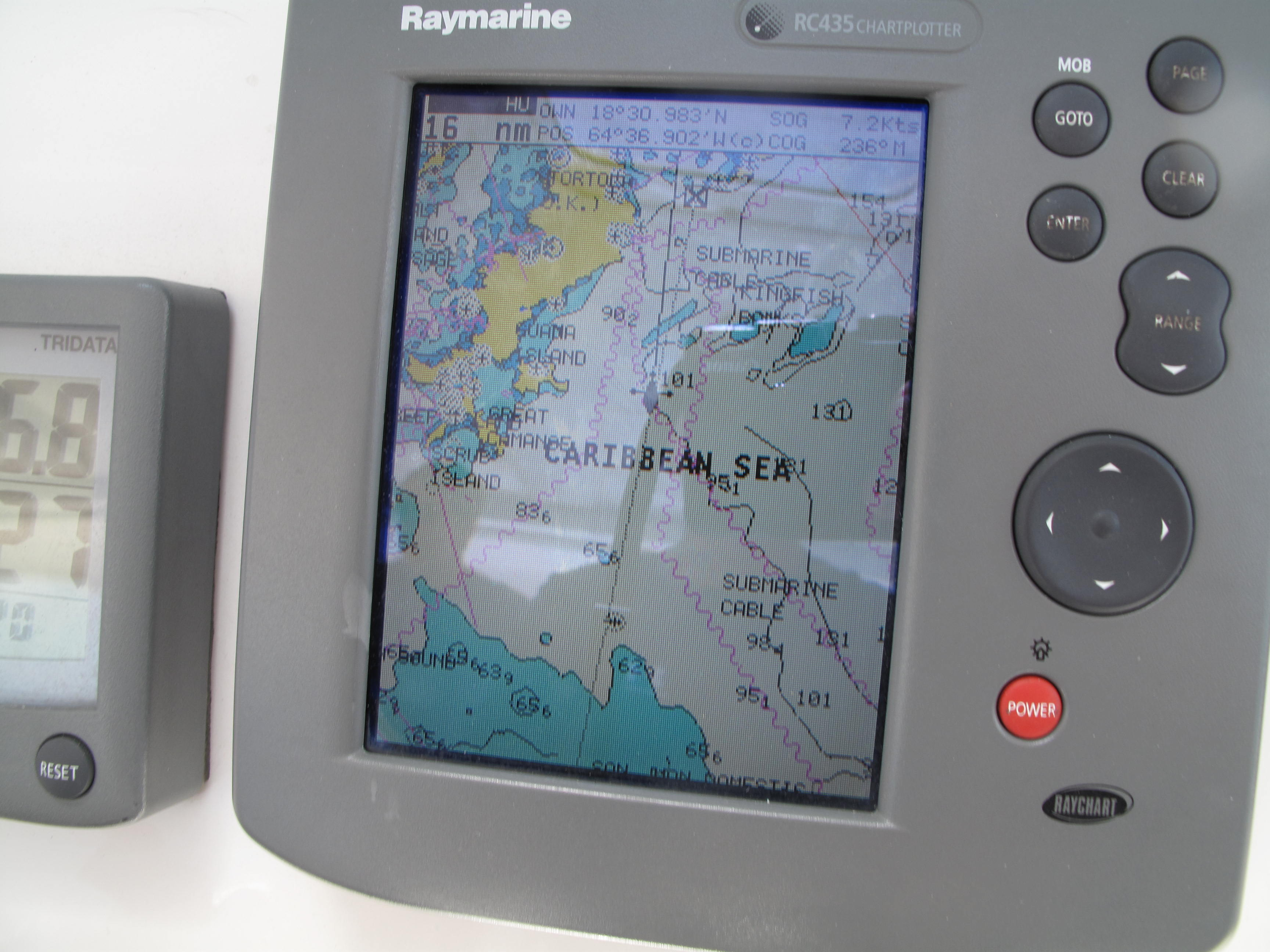
A Raymarine chartplotter

The chartplotter displays the ENC along with the position, heading and speed of the ship, and may display additional information from radar, automatic identification systems (AIS), or other sensors.

As appropriate to particular marine applications, chartplotters may also display data from other sensors, such as echolocators or sonar.

== Technology ==
Electronic chartplotters are by nature CPU- and GPU-intensive applications. Chartplotters need to retrieve the navigation signal (Galileo, GPS, GLONASS, WAAS, etc.) and overlay that on a map. Map updates on dedicated hardware typically have screen refresh rates from 5 Hz to 30 Hz.

Some navigation software can run on standard computers (and mobile phones, etc.) but most higher end systems are dedicated hardware. Especially when the chartplotter generates three-dimensional displays, as used for fishing, considerable processing power and video memory may be required.

As with all marine systems, chart-plotters generally are not used alone. In commercial ships, they are integrated into a full system of marine instruments that can guide the ship under any conditions. These other instruments include sonar transducers, integration with two-way radio communication devices and emergency locators (EPIRB).

The integration of these devices is very important as it becomes quite distracting to look at several different screens. Therefore, displays can often overlay charting, radar, sonar into a single system. This gives the captain unprecedented instrumentation to maneuver the ship. With digital backbones, these devices have advanced greatly in the last years. For example, the newer ones have 3D displays that allow you to see above, below and all around the ship, including overlays of satellite imaging.

== Electronic charts ==
An individual electronic chart, or, more commonly, a database of charts, is the heart of a chartplotter. The chartplotter system can be no more accurate than its charts. Without charts that are accredited by appropriate governmental organizations, a chartplotter is an example of an Electronic Charting System (ECS). When the charts meet the technical requirements of the International Maritime Organization (IMO) and national hydrographic bodies, the chartplotter can qualify as an Electronic Chart Display and Information System (ECDIS). ECDIS legally can be substituted for paper charts while navigating in active waterways, but vessels are required to maintain paper charts if their chartplotter does not use ECDIS.

ECDIS will use IMO-standardized formats, but some chartplotters require specific data formats. A charter may use one or both types of ENC:

- Raster Charts: The chart plotter displays a "picture" of a paper chart or map which is referenced to geographic coordinates. A GPS position can be displayed upon the raster chart, but accuracy depends upon many factors including the type of projection (e.g. conic or mercator) used in the original chart, and the reference system used (e.g. NAD-27 or WGS-84).
- Vector Charts: The chart plotter constructs a facsimile of a chart using raw data from a data base. The major advantages are a reduction in the amount of data to be stored, and the ability of the chart plotter to identify certain features (such as water depth) and act upon them (e.g. do not allow the ship to run aground)

== Human interfaces ==
A basic navigational display is common to all chartplotters. Depending on intended use and characteristics of the specific chartplotter, they may have options to present such displays as three-dimensional fish-finding and bottom characteristics useful in fishing.

These optional displays can be presented by commands to a single screen, causing the main display to be replaced with the one requested. Alternatively, chartplotters may offer split-screen modes on a single physical screen, or may support multiple physical displays.

Chartplotters may be programmable, and can be set to generate audible and visual alarms for conditions such as a potential collision, deviating significantly from the planned course, etc.

== Related applications ==
The principal function of a classic chartplotter is assisting a human pilot to plot and follow a course.

Safety-related Automatic identification systems (AIS), required on all passenger vessels and vessels of 300 tons and over, also assist in piloting, and can display on the chartplotter. AIS have collision avoidance, and avoidance of known hazards such as reefs, as their primary function. AIS depend on cooperative data communications among ships.

Vessel traffic services (VTS) go even farther as safety systems, being analogous to the proactive function of air traffic control systems. VTS assist vessel traffic control in routing vessels in busy waters. Other vessel-based safety collision avoidance functions are Automatic Radar Plotting Aids (ARPA), usually a component of the radar system or an accessory to it, and coupled with the radar system input to the chartplotter.
