= Navico =

Marine electronics company

- Industry: Marine electronics
- Founded: 2006
- Headquarters: Egersund, Norway
- Key people: Aine Denari (President)
- Revenue: ▲$373 Million USD (2018)
- Owners: Brunswick Corporation
- Number of employees: 1,800 (2019)
- Website: navico.com

Navico is a marine electronics company providing navigation, marine instruments and fish finding equipment to both the recreational and commercial marine sectors.

The Navico Recreational Marine Division is one of the world's largest provider of leisure marine electronic products. Lowrance is aimed at fishing, particularly in freshwater and near coastal areas. Simrad Yachting is focused on powerboat owners for cruising and sportfishing and B&G serves the sailing market.

The Simrad Commercial Marine Electronics division also offers navigation products for the commercial market, while C-MAP provides cartography and digital products to both recreational and commercial markets.

Navico has its headquarters in Egersund, Norway, and the group has manufacturing facilities in the United States, UK, Norway, Mexico and New Zealand.

== History ==
=== 20th century: Predecessors ===
In 1946 Simonsen Radio was founded by Willy Simonsen (NOR) leading the development of echo-sounding equipment. Simrad Yachting was born from the union of Simonsen Radio and other marine technology pioneers.

In 1955 Brookes & Gatehouse (B&G) was founded by Major R.N Gatehouse and Ronald Brookes (UK). In 1957 Lowrance Electronics was created by Darrell Lowrance (US) and launched the first recreational sonar product for anglers – the Fish-Lo-K-Tor, also known as the ‘Little Green Box’.

=== 21st century: Foundation and expansion ===
In 2003 Simrad Yachting acquired B&G. In 2005 Altor 2003 Fund acquired Simrad Yachting AS from Kongsberg Group. In 2006 Altor 2003 Fund acquired Lowrance Electronics. Also in 2006, Navico was created through the merger of Simrad Yachting and Lowrance Electronics by their common owners, Altor Equity Partners, a Swedish private equity firm. In 2007 Navico acquired the marine electronics business of Brunswick New Technologies creating the world’s largest supplier of marine electronics for recreational boats.

2016 Goldman Sachs Merchant Banking Division and Altor Fund IV signed an agreement to acquire Navico Holding AS (Navico) and Digital Marine Solutions Holding AS (Digital Marine Solutions), owner of Jeppesen Marine, from the Altor 2003 Fund. In 2016 Navico expands manufacturing plant in Ensenada, Mexico adding 50,000 sq ft. In 2017 Navico acquired C-MAP, providing cartography products and services for all types of leisure boaters, from fishermen and sailing enthusiasts to powerboat owners around the world. In 2019 Knut Frostad was appointed as President and CEO of Navico.

In 2021 Brunswick Corporation acquired Navico.

== Brands ==
=== B&G ===
B&G, formerly Brookes and Gatehouse, was founded over 60 years ago and manufactures sailing electronics for cruising and racing yachts. B&G systems are used by professional race boats as well as amateur club racers and sailing superyachts. The B&G range encompasses chart plotters, navigation equipment, instruments, autopilots, and radar, plus tactical racing software and other performance measurement and analysis.

=== C-MAP ===
Founded in 1985, C-MAP serves boaters worldwide, providing cartography products and services for all types of leisure boaters, from fishermen and sailing enthusiasts to powerboat owners. C-MAP worldwide cartography products and services include multiple formats for lakes, coasts, and oceans.

C-MAP also provides products and services to the commercial marine sector. The majority of C-MAPs products and services for this sector were sold to Lloyd's Register in December 2020.

=== Lowrance ===
Lowrance is a manufacturer of consumer sonar and GPS receivers, as well as digital mapping systems. Headquartered in Tulsa, Oklahoma, with production facilities in Ensenada, Mexico, Lowrance employs approximately 1,000 people. The company is best known for its High Definition Systems (HDS) and add-on performance modules which include Broadband 4G Radar, StructureScan with SideScan and DownScan Imaging, Sonic Hub Audio, Sirius LWX-1 Weather, and NAIS Collision Avoidance.

Lowrance was founded in Tulsa, Oklahoma in 1957. In 2006, Simrad Yachting and Lowrance merged in a deal valued at $215 million, creating a new company named Navico. In 2006, Lowrance was purchased by Simrad Yachting for $215 million. This merger went on to create Navico, now the largest leisure marine electronics manufacturer in the world. The Lowrance brand is wholly owned by Navico, a privately held, international corporation, Navico is currently the world’s largest marine electronics company, and is the parent company to leading marine electronics brands: Lowrance, Simrad Yachting and B&G.

=== Simrad ===
Simrad is a manufacturer of marine electronics for the leisure and professional markets. A member of the Navico family of brands, Simrad develops, manufactures and distributes navigation systems, autopilots, marine VHF radios, chartplotters, echosounders, radars, fishfinders and a wide range of other marine technology.

The Simrad name has been in existence for over sixty years. The brand was established in 1947 by Willy Christian Simonsen, who set up his own wireless company called Simonsen Radio. Initially, he focused on the production of radio communications for fishing vessels. A few years later, he coined the name Simrad to encompass a wider range of activities – namely the design and manufacture of navigation, communication, auto-steering, and fish-finding technologies.

In 1996 the Simrad Group was purchased by the Kongsberg Group which, following a decision to focus on the industrial market, sold the Simrad recreational product range to Altor Equity Partners in 2005, creating Simrad Yachting. Simrad Group and Simrad Yachting are therefore now entirely independent of each other, with separate owners and distinct product specializations. It was the merger of Simrad Yachting and Lowrance Inc in 2006 that went on to create the Navico Group, now the largest leisure marine electronics manufacturer in the world.

Simrad produces a range of navigation instruments designed to withstand challenging conditions and provide navigation solutions for both leisure boaters (via the Simrad Yachting range) and coastal mariners (via the Simrad Professional range). In 2008 the company absorbed MX Marine – acquired as a result of the takeover by Navico of the marine electronics division of Brunswick New Technologies Inc in 2007 – into its Simrad Professional line-up, further extending its position in the commercial GPS and DGPS sector. Over the past seventy years, they have developed systems for commercial vessels offering a range of radar systems, auto steering, navigation, and safety products for vessels of all sizes, from small vessels on inland waterways to larger coastal commercial and passenger craft.
