= Self-steering gear =

Navigational equipment

Self-steering gear is equipment used on sail boats to maintain a chosen course or point of sail without constant human action.

== History ==
Mechanical or "wind vane" self-steering started out as a way to keep model sail boats on course. Before the advent of radio control, model yacht racing (started before WW1) was typically contested on long narrow ponds, and the number of stops along the banks was counted as a penalty in the final result. Initially a system of counterweight on the tillers was devised to compensate for the weather helm when the model boat heeled in a gust. These crude systems evolved in a more sophisticated system called Braine Gear after its inventor, George Braine. The Braine steering gear was a fine-tuned system of quadrant on the rudder stock driven by the tension of the mainsail sheet and damped by a rubber band. A more sophisticated system called the vane gear was later devised, it relied on a small vane or airfoil driving the main rudder via an adjustable system of clockwork gears. It was very similar to the later vane driven autopilots seen on transatlantic yachts such as Blondie Hasler's self steering rudder. Some transatlantic singlehanded sailors used a crude form of self steering devices to cross the Atlantic Ocean in the 1920s and 1930s, the most notable being Frenchman Marin Marie (Paul Marin Durand Couppel de Saint Front) who crossed the Atlantic twice in the 1930s, first on a sailing yacht called Winnibelle II and secondly on a motor pinnace called Arielle.

Self steering aboard Winnibelle II on its Atlantic crossing from Douarnenez, France, to New York in 1933 was somewhat similar to a Braine gear, using twin jibs (Trinquettes jumelles) with their sheets connected to the rudder via an array of blocks and lines. The long keeled Winnibelle II was perfectly stable on course on close-hauled or beam reach points of sailing but the self steering twin jib system could take over in the trickier downwind broad reaches and running points of sailing.

On the small motor pinnace Arielle, a 13 m (43 ft) boat propelled by a 65 hp (48 kW) French-made Baudouin diesel engine which sailed from New York to Le Havre in 1936, the task of steering a motor boat in the Atlantic swells was more daunting. Arielle had two rudders; the main one under the hull, in the propeller race, was for manual steering and the smaller auxiliary rudder was transom mounted. This auxiliary rudder could be mechanically driven by a special wind vane mounted atop of the coachroof consisting of two rectangular airfoils set at an angle on a vertical axle and balanced by a counterweight. It was simple and worked quite well, but could not steer the boat in very light breezes or flat calm.

While Marin Marie was fitting out Arielle in New York he was approached by a French inventor named Casel who offered to fit an electrical autopilot of his invention, free of charge. The Casel autopilot was using the then revolutionary photoelectric cells and a system of light and reflecting mirrors on the magnetic compass rose. Its principle is somewhat similar to modern day electronic autohelms, excepting the modern flux-gate sensor for autopilots system. The Casel autopilot, which included an array of green, red and white telltale control lights, used an electric motor to act on the main rudder. Though its basic principle was sound and was useful in some sections of the passage, it proved to be somewhat too lightly built for a wet vibrating little boat and was trouble ridden. Marin Marie, though appreciative in some occasions generally loathed the temperamental device, specially when he discovered that Casel had inadvertently hidden his stores of Bordeaux wine in the autopilot compartment, unwillingly condemning him to a teetotal Atlantic crossing of some 20 days.

== Electronic ==
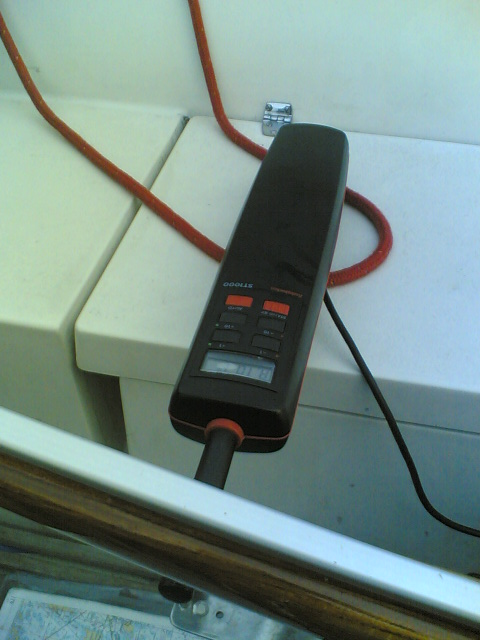
A tiller-pilot on a sailing boat - simple electronic self-steering.

Electronic self-steering is controlled by electronics operating according to one or more input sensors, invariably at least a magnetic compass and sometimes wind direction or GPS position versus a chosen waypoint. The electronics module calculates the required steering movement and a drive mechanism (usually electrical, though possibly hydraulic in larger systems) causes the rudder to move accordingly.

There are several possibilities for the interface between the drive mechanism and the conventional steering system. On yachts, the three most common systems are:

- Direct drive, in which an actuator is attached to the steering quadrant, at the top of the rudder stock inside the boat. This is the least intrusive method of installation.
- Wheel mounting, in which a motor is mounted near the steering wheel, and can be engaged with it when in use. This typically involves either a belt drive or a toothed gear-ring attached to the wheel itself, and is a common option for retro-fitted installations on yachts with a wheel.
- Tiller-pilots are usually the only option on smaller vessels steered with a tiller. They consist of an electrically driven ram which is mounted between the tiller and a fitting on the side of the cockpit. Some are entirely self-contained, needing only a power supply, while others have the control unit separate from the actuator. These are quite popular, as they are maintenance-free and easy to install.

Workings of a marine tiller-pilot

Depending on the sophistication of the control unit (e.g. tiller pilot, steering wheel attached chartplotter, ...), electronic self-steering gear can be programmed to hold a certain compass course, to maintain a certain angle to the wind (so that sailing boats need not change their sail trim), to steer towards a certain position, or any other function which can reasonably be defined. However, the amount of power required by electrical actuators, especially if constantly in action because of sea and weather conditions, is a serious consideration. Long-distance cruisers, which have no external source of electricity and often do not run their engines for propulsion, typically have relatively strict power budgets and do not use electrical steering for any length of time. As the electronic autopilot systems require electricity to operate, many vessels also make use of photovoltiac (PV) solar panels or small wind turbines on the boat. This eliminates extra pollution and cuts costs.

== Mechanical ==
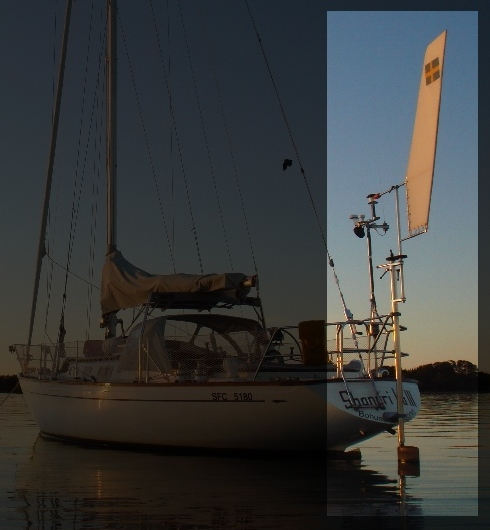
Yacht with highlighted self-steering device

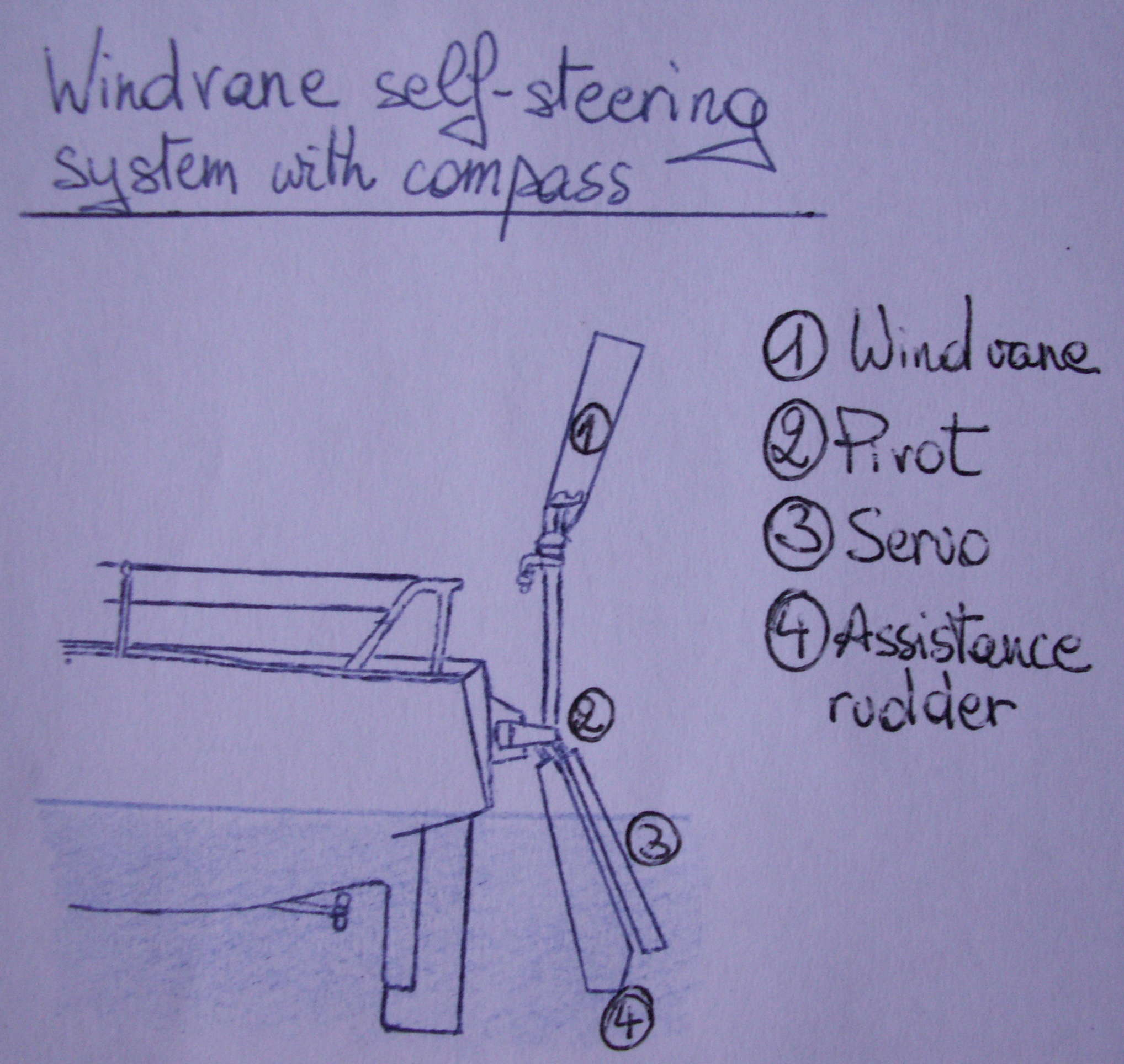
A windvane self-steering with auxiliary rudder and trim tab servo

The main goal of a mechanical self-steering gear is to keep a sailboat on a given course towards the apparent wind and to free the helmsman from the steering job. An advantageous side effect is that the sails are kept in optimal angle towards the apparent wind and deliver optimal propulsion force by that. Even in sailboats running under engine, the self steering gear can be used to keep the boat heading into the wind to easily set or change sails (exception: sheet-to-tiller principle).
As wind direction sensors are used
a) a wind vane mounted on an axis being tilted more or less towards the horizon (wind vane self-steering)
b) the pressure of the wind in the sail(s) and by that the force on the sheet (sheet to tiller self-steering).

The different mechanical principles of coupling a change in apparent wind direction mechanically with a course changing actuator (rudder) can be roughly grouped:

- Trimm-tab (Flettner servo tab) systems, wind vane coupled with a small flap attached at the main rudder, an auxiliary rudder or a servo pendulum rudder.
- Vane to auxiliary rudder (Windpilot Atlantik, Hydrovane) with a wind vane directly coupled to an auxiliary rudder.
- Vane to rudder (only applicable for very small boats, a large wind vane is directly coupled to the ship's rudder).
- Servo pendulum rudder (a wind vane turns an immersed blade around its vertical axis, the blade swings out to the side due to the movement through the water and turns the ship's rudder with that).
- Servo pendulum with auxiliary rudder (like above, but the servo pendulum blade acts on an auxiliary rudder and not on the ship's rudder).
- Sheet-to-tiller (a spring load at the tiller is counteracted by the pulling force of a foresail and/or main sail sheet).

== Present day autopilots ==
Mechanical self-steering units are made by a number of manufacturers, but most systems produced today share the same principle (servo pendulum rudder, see below). As well as their requirement for electric power, many long-distance cruisers observe that electronic self-steering machinery is complex and unlikely to be repairable without spare parts in remote areas. By contrast the vane gear offers at least the possibility of an improvised repair at sea, and can usually be rebuilt on land using non-specific parts (sometimes plumbing parts) by a local welder or machinist. To minimize the speed loss by the self steering gear it is essential to have the vessel's sails balanced with little load on the rudder before any attempt is made to engage the self steering. With the sails are trimmed correctly, the force-balance of the servo oar and the main or auxiliary rudder is minimized that way, that the lowest angles of attack of rudder and servo oar towards the water flow are achieved. Some experimentation and judgement is usually needed, however, to determine the proper settings for a given vessel and steering mechanism. A popular source on contemporary windvane technology is The Windvane Self-Steering Handbook. One particularly valuable contribution of Morris's book is his coverage of the variety of alloys used in vane gear manufacturing. Morris admits to his practice of setting a kitchen timer for a half-hour at a time and sleeping while the windvane steering device controls the helm, even in head winds of 25 to 35 knots. In a recent interview, he said he once narrowly missed being hit by a huge freighter while sleeping on his sail up the Red Sea. Morris points out, "An autopilot wouldn't have made any difference in this case. If I had been using an electronic autopilot, that freighter still would have been there. I made a choice to sail two-thirds of my circumnavigation single-handed, and I accepted the risks that came with that decision. I guess fate was on my side."

=== Trim-tab ===
In former trim-tab servo systems, the pivot movement of the servo blade around its vertical axis has been carried out by a trim tab servo tab, which however costs some force due to the fact, that the trim tab is moved in the opposite direction to turn the servo blade. The same holds for a trim tab, which is mounted at a big distance behind the ship's rudder, connected to it at its upper and lower end. This construction is called "The Saye's Rigg". Another version of wind vane self steering on sail boats is known as the vertical axis vane and usually, because of the inferior steering force output compared to servo pendulum devices it makes use of a trim tab hung off the rudder to control the course of the boat. The vane spins at right angles to the ground and can lock to the trim tab in any desired position, as the boat falls off the wind the vane will be turned by the wind and will take the trim tab with it which in turn causes the rudder to move in the opposite direction and thus corrects course. Generally self steering like this, with a trim tab can only be used on boats with transom (or aft hung double enders) rudders as the trim tab needs to be mounted directly to and aft of the rudder to produce the desired effect, and of course has to be controlled even as the rudder swings side to side. This is typically accomplished by use of a slotted bar in which the connection to the vane assembly can slide in as the rudder turns. These self steering systems are generally simpler and are thus easier to set and adjust course as they do not make use of lines controlling the rudder but control it more directly through solid linkages. A related device has been used on some windmills, the fantail, a small windmill mounted at right angles to the main sails which automatically turns the heavy cap and main sails into the wind, (invented in England in 1745). (When the wind is already directly into the main vanes, the fantail remains essentially motionless.)

=== Vane to auxiliary rudder ===
Only few manufacturers have been successful with systems that operate an auxiliary rudder directly from the windvane (non-servo systems: Windpilot Atlantik, Hydrovane); the picture of the windvane shown uses this principle with the large fabric vane on a vertical axis (the use of wind vanes with a nearly horizontal axis is used predominantly).

=== Servo pendulum rudder ===
The most widespread form of self-steering, the servo pendulum, was introduced to cope with the power required to operate a larger rudder and was a successor to the servo trim tab principle (introduced by Herbert "Blondie" Hasler). Common to all servo pendulum rudder (oar, blade) systems is the fact, that the speed of the boat through the water is used to amplify the small force coming from the wind vane in order to be able to turn the rudder. The servo blade can be turned in its vertical axis and is hung like a pendulum. When it is turned around its vertical axis, the water flow initiates a sideways force on the blade area, and the forceful swing movement to the side is used to act on a rudder (ship's rudder or auxiliary rudder being integrated in the system). A narrow upright board, the wind vane, is mounted on a nearly horizontal axis carrier that is itself rotated around its vertical axis so that with the boat traveling in the desired direction the vane is vertical and edge-on to the wind. The wind vane is balanced by a small weight below the pivot, but if the boat turns so that the board is no longer edge-on to the wind it will be blown over to one side as the extra surface area is revealed. This movement is transmitted by a series of linkages to a blade (or oar) in the water, so that the oar is turned around its vertical axis, when the wind vane rotates from its neutral position. As the blade described above turns, the pressure of water moving past it causes it to swing out sideways on the end of a pivoted rod. An immersed area of 0.1 m^{2} at 1 m lever length at a boat speed of 2.5 m/s (about 5 knots) and 5° angle of attack already generates a moment of 180 N⋅m, when the oar has a NACA0012 profile. The steering force of the servo oar is transmitted to the main rudder typically involving an arrangement of two lines and four or more rolls to guide the steering ropes to the helm or the steering wheel.

Modern servo pendulum self-steering devices with optimized transmission and low friction mechanics are more and more used for day sailing and cruising; formerly being used mainly for long distance ocean passages. The increased low wind capabilities of optimized, modern devices enable downwind steering down to 1.3 m/s apparent wind and 1.5 kn of boat speed – properties that make an electronic steering device nearly redundant and enable crossing the doldrums under wind vane self-steering. An increasing number of long distance regatta sailors are using wind vane self-steering because the sails are always kept in optimal angle towards the wind, and hence the speed of the boat is kept at the possible maximum.

The mathematical description of the horizontal windvane servo self-steering covers the relation of a course error to a steady-state rudder angle to correct for the course error. The dynamics are described by force and momentum coupling equations. Mainly three different mechanical transmission principles are in use: Murray slide-block joint, 90° bevel gear, Z-shaft, which due to their geometry have different steering force changes by course error change.

=== Servo pendulum with auxiliary rudder ===
In cases, when a pure servo pendulum self-steering gear is not usable (hydraulic rudder gear, very big force needed to turn the rudder), auxiliary rudder systems are used. They consist of a servo pendulum rudder coupled directly to an auxiliary rudder which is part of the self-steering system. The main rudder in such case is used to "trim" the main course and the self-steering gear steers "around" that main course according to the changes of the apparent wind.

=== Sheet to tiller ===
Aside of the widespread mechanical self-steering through a wind vane being mechanically coupled to the rudder or a servo pendulum rudder, there is a mechanical self steering principle called "sheet-to-tiller". Rollo Gebhard crossed the Atlantic in his 5.6 m long Solveig using such a method. The sheet-to-tiller self-steering consists of a connection between the spring-loaded tiller and a sheet using the force of the wind in the sail to steer the boat.

== Developments ==
For quite a long time there was little development in the self steering systems that were available commercially. Most new developments came in the form of self-build systems. Crucial roles were played by Walt Murray, an American who published his designs on his website. and Dutchman Jan Alkema who developed a new windvane, the so-called up side down windvane (USD for short, commercially available from only two brands) and a new kind of servo pendulum system that could be fitted to boats with a transom hung rudder. For this last invention Jan Alkema was rewarded the John Hogg-Price from the AYRS ( Amateur Yacht Research Society) in 2005. Jan Alkema published a lot of his inventions on Walt Murray's website.

Joern Heinrich added in 2010 a mechanism using the roll angle of the boat in downwind situation for a correctional servo oar angle of attack which increases course stability and lowers the risk of broaching in following seas. Joern Heinrich also published a mechanism which uses a fin in the water to compensate for the apparent wind change during the acceleration/deceleration of multihull yachts with larger speed potential like catamarans and trimarans in gusts. Heinrich applies his own parametric simulation software VaneSim to optimize windvane self-steering devices according to boat properties.

== Famous self-steering boats ==
Some notable self-steering sailboats include:

- Son of Town Hall, self-steering junk raft which made a transatlantic crossing in 1998
- Gipsy Moth IV
- Jester

== See also ==
- Chartplotter
- Unmanned surface vehicle
