= National Executive Committee for Space-Based Positioning, Navigation and Timing =

The National Executive Committee for Space-Based Positioning, Navigation and Timing (PNT) is a United States Government organization which advises and coordinates federal departments and agencies on matters concerning the Global Positioning System, space navigation, navigational references, and related systems.

It was established by Presidential Directive in 2004 and supersedes the Interagency GPS Executive Board.

The PNT is jointly chaired by the Deputy Secretaries of Defense and Transportation.
