= Notice Advisory to Navstar Users =

GPS health and operation updates by US Coast Guard and Schriever

A Notice Advisory to Navstar Users (NANU) is a message issued jointly by the United States Coast Guard and the GPS Operations Center at Schriever Space Force Base in Colorado. Such notices (NANUs) provide updates on the general health of individual satellites in the GPS constellation. NANUs are typically issued approximately three days prior to a change in the operation of a GPS satellite, such as a change in orbit or scheduled on-board equipment maintenance.

== NANU types ==
=== Forecast outages ===
- FCSTDV, or Forecast Delta-V, gives scheduled outage times for Delta-V maneuvers. The satellite is moved during this maintenance and the user may be required to download a new almanac.
- FCSTMX, or Forecast Maintenance, gives scheduled outage times for Ion Pump Operations or software tests.
- FCSTEXTD, or Forecast Extension, extends the scheduled outage time "Until Further Notice"; references the original NANU.
- FCSTSUMM, or Forecast Summary, gives the exact outage times for the scheduled outage, including the FCSTEXTD; sent after the maintenance is complete and the satellite is set healthy to users; references the original NANU.
- FCSTCANC, or Forecast Cancellation, cancels a scheduled outage; new maintenance time not yet determined; references the original NANU.
- FCSTRESCD, or Forecast Rescheduled, reschedules a scheduled outage; references the original NANU.
- FCSTUUFN, or Forecast Unusable Until Further Notice, scheduled outage of indefinite duration not necessarily related to Delta-V or maintenance activities.

=== Unscheduled outages ===
- UNUSABLE, or UNUSABLE with a reference NANU, closes out an UNUSUFN NANU and gives the exact outage times for the outage; references the UNUSUFN NANU.
- UNUSUFN, or Unusable Until Further Notice, notifies users that a satellite will be Unusable to all users until further notice.
- UNUNOREF, or UNUSABLE with no reference NANU, gives times for outages that were resolved before a UNUSUFN NANU could be sent.

=== Other ===
- LEAPSEC, or Leap Second, is used to notify users of an impending Leap Second and all data after the subject line is free flowing text.
- LAUNCH, is used to notify users of a recent GPS launch.
- DECOM, is used to notify users that an SV has been removed from the current constellation identified within the broadcast almanac, but does not necessarily signify permanent disposal.
- USABINIT, or Initially Usable, notifies users that a satellite is set healthy for the first time.
- GENERAL, informs the user of general GPS information and is written using free flowing text.
