= Interagency GPS Executive Board =

The Interagency GPS Executive Board (IGEB) was an agency of the United States federal government that sought to integrate the needs and desires of various governmental agencies into formal Global Positioning System Planning. GPS was administered by the Department of Defense, but had grown to service a wide variety of constituents. The majority of GPS uses are now non-military, so this board was fundamental in ensuring the needs of non-military users.

In 2004, the IGEB was superseded by the National Executive Committee for Space-Based Positioning, Navigation and Timing (PNT), established by presidential order.
