= CubETH =

Swiss satellite project

- Mission type: Satellite navigation Technology demonstration
- Operator: ETH Zurich
- Mission duration: 18 months planned

Spacecraft properties
- Spacecraft type: 1U CubeSat
- Launch mass: 1.388 kilograms (3.06 lb).

Orbital parameters
- Semi-major axis: 6,830 kilometres (4,240 mi) to 6,930 kilometres (4,310 mi)

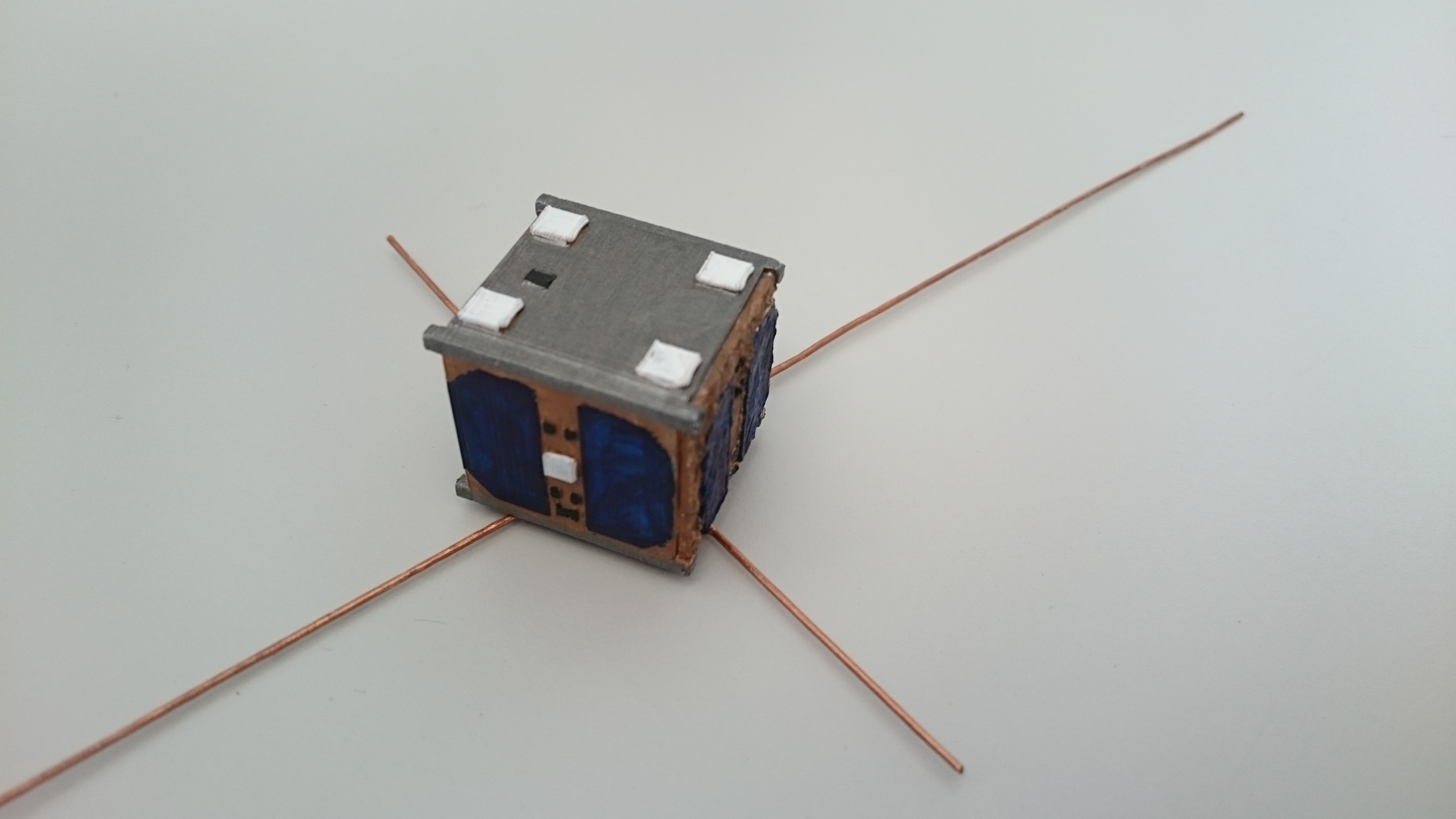
3D printed model of CubETH

CubETH is a Swiss satellite project. As of 2015, it is being developed by several Swiss academic and industrial partners. The spacecraft is a single unit CubeSat and therefore 10 × 10 × 10 cm (3.9 × 3.9 × 3.9 in) in size. Its main goal is to prove the feasibility of attitude and orbit determination with low cost commercial off-the-shelf GNSS-receivers.

== Aims ==
CubETH is a technology demonstration mission. The first goal is to prove that low cost receivers can be used for positioning in space. The orbit as well as the attitude of the spacecraft will be computed on board the satellite and send to a station on earth. The post-processing of the data will allow a first plausibility check. In order to fulfil an external validation, CubETH will be equipped with satellite laser ranging reflectors for range measurements from ground stations.

== Satellite structure ==
The upper face of the satellite will be equipped with four GNSS antennas. The four side faces hold the solar panels for electricity generation. A fifth GNSS antenna is mounted on one of the lateral faces. The communication antenna is located on the lower, earth looking face. The whole flight electronics is located inside the satellite. In addition to the five GNSS antennas and the SLR-reflectors, The payload consists of the GNSS receivers and the necessary hardware. The GNSS receiver chips are developed and manufactured by the Swiss company U-blox. The main advantage of these commercial chip-sets is the low power consumption and the small size. However, the chips are not certified for space applications and a risk assessment is part of the project. For redundancy reasons, the satellite is equipped with ten receivers, each antenna being connected to two of them.

== Project partners ==
The Geodesy and Geodynamics Lab of ETH Zurich holds the scientific leadership and is responsible for the payload data processing software. EPFL and the Swiss Space Center (SSC) are in charge of project management and the realization of the satellite bus. Lucerne University of Applied Sciences and Arts develops the payload hardware and the ground station. RF and antenna-design is provided by Hochschule für Technik Rapperswil. Further project partners are HES-SO (academic partner), u-blox (industrial partner), RUAG Space (industrial partner) and Saphyrion (industrial partner).

== Status ==
CubETH is currently under development. The launch was planned for 2017.

== See also ==
- List of CubeSats
