= Mons Latreille =

Mountain on the Moon

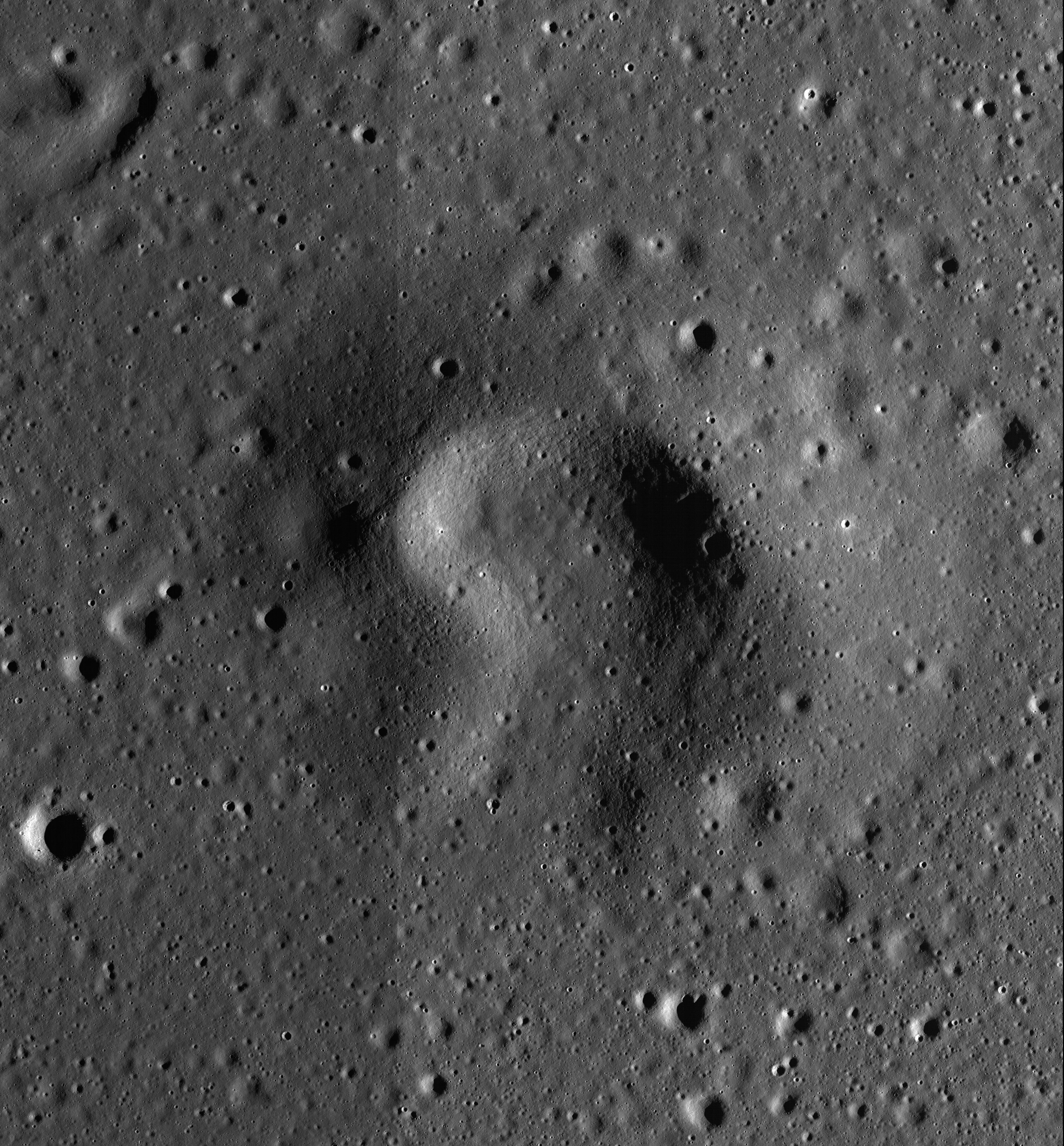
- Mons Latreille from LRO. Blue Ghost Mission 1 landed near the upper left corner of the image.

Highest point
- Listing: Lunar mountains
- Coordinates: 18.47°N 61.92°E

Naming
- Etymology: Pierre André Latreille

Geography
- Location: the Moon

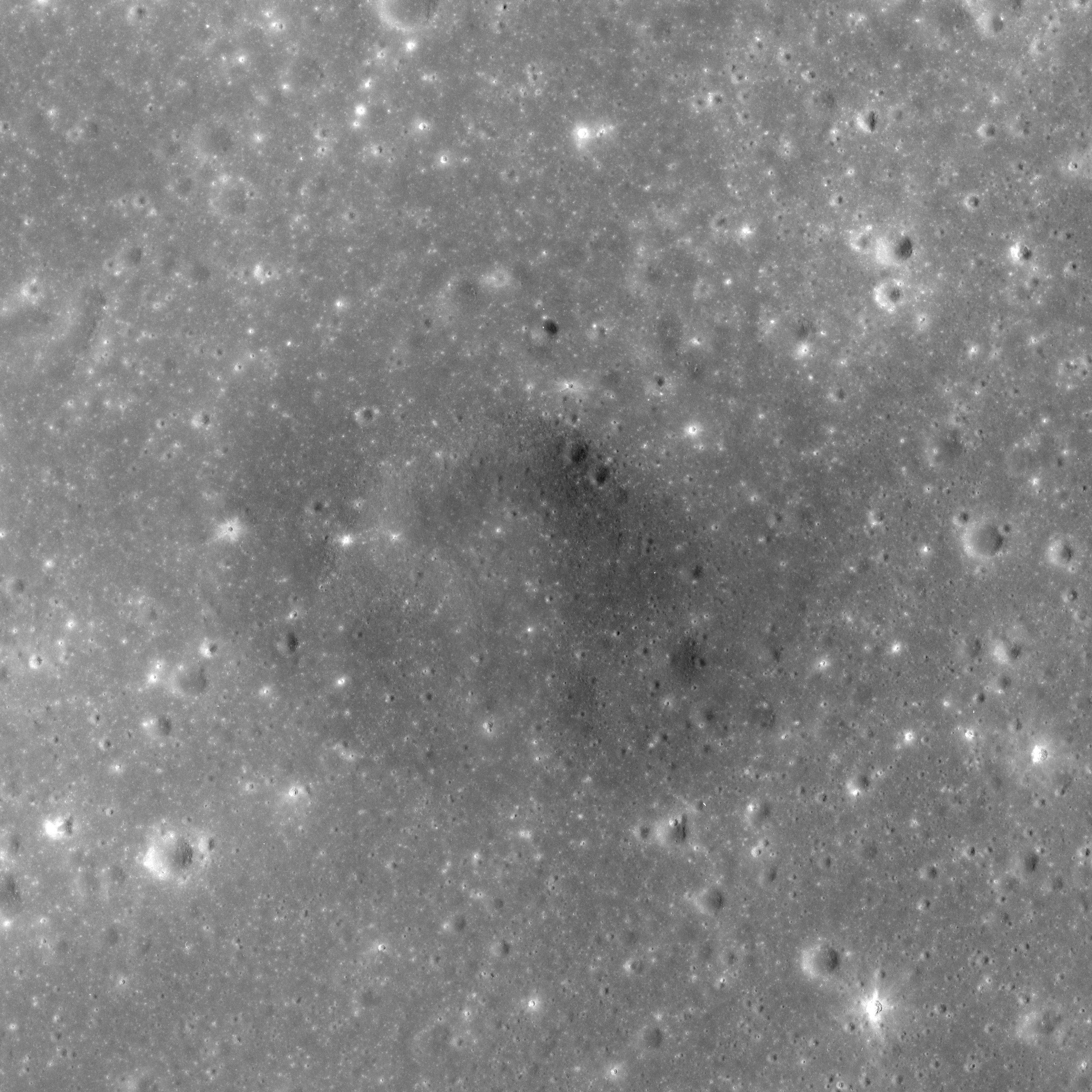
Mons Latreille from Apollo 17

Mons Latreille is a solitary lunar mountain in central Mare Crisium. This feature was named by the IAU in May 2021, after Pierre André Latreille, a French entomologist. It rises approximately 150 m above the surrounding mare, and it is approximately 6.4 km in diameter.

The mountain is a volcanic feature similar to Isis and Osiris in Mare Serenitatis.

Firefly Aerospace's lunar lander carried NASA-sponsored experiments and commercial payloads as a part of Commercial Lunar Payload Services program to Mons Latreille. The Blue Ghost Mission 1 landed near its slopes on 2 March 2025 at 18.56°N 61.81°E, less than 2 kilometers northwest of the base of the mountain.

Dorsa Tetyaev are to the northeast of Mons Latreille. The small crater Eckert is to the southwest.

== See also ==
- List of mountains on the Moon
