= RICS Books =

British publisher

- Parent company: Royal Institution of Chartered Surveyors
- Founded: 1999; 26 years ago
- Country of origin: United Kingdom
- Distribution: Worldwide
- Nonfiction topics: Surveying, construction and other related property fields
- Official website: www.rics.org

RICS Shop is the commercial publishing and bookselling arm of the Royal Institution of Chartered Surveyors.

== RICS Shop Online ==
The RICS Books website was launched in 1999 and grew and developed over the years to become a fully operational e-commerce website. In 2012 it moved to a new domain RICS Shop on a new e-commerce platform. The site offers over 15,000 publications, contracts, software, digital products and has many dedicated sections such as JCT Contracts, Price Books and Contracts. The website is continuously updated and developed to provide users with an increasingly positive experience and to stay up to speed with modern-day technology.

== Publishing ==
The publishing division of RICS provides the source of information for surveyors and related professionals.

Specialist practice areas covered include: Building surveying; Commercial property; Construction; Dispute resolution; Environment; Facilities management; Geomatics; Machinery & Business Assets; Management consultancy; Minerals and Waste management; Planning & development; Project management; Residential property; Rural, and Valuation.

== Bookselling ==
The retail division of RICS stocks over 15,000 books, contracts, software titles and CPD products for professionals, academics and students in the areas of surveying, construction and other related property fields. It is also an authorized retailer for JCT contracts, NEC contracts and other leading texts such as Spon's Price Books, SMM7 and The RICS Red Book Valuation Standards.
