= GNSS applications =

Applications of Global Navigation Satellite System

Global Navigation Satellite System (GNSS) receivers, using the GPS, GLONASS, Galileo or BeiDou system, are used in many applications. The first systems were developed in the 20th century, mainly to help military personnel find their way, but location awareness soon found many civilian applications.

== Navigation ==
=== On land ===
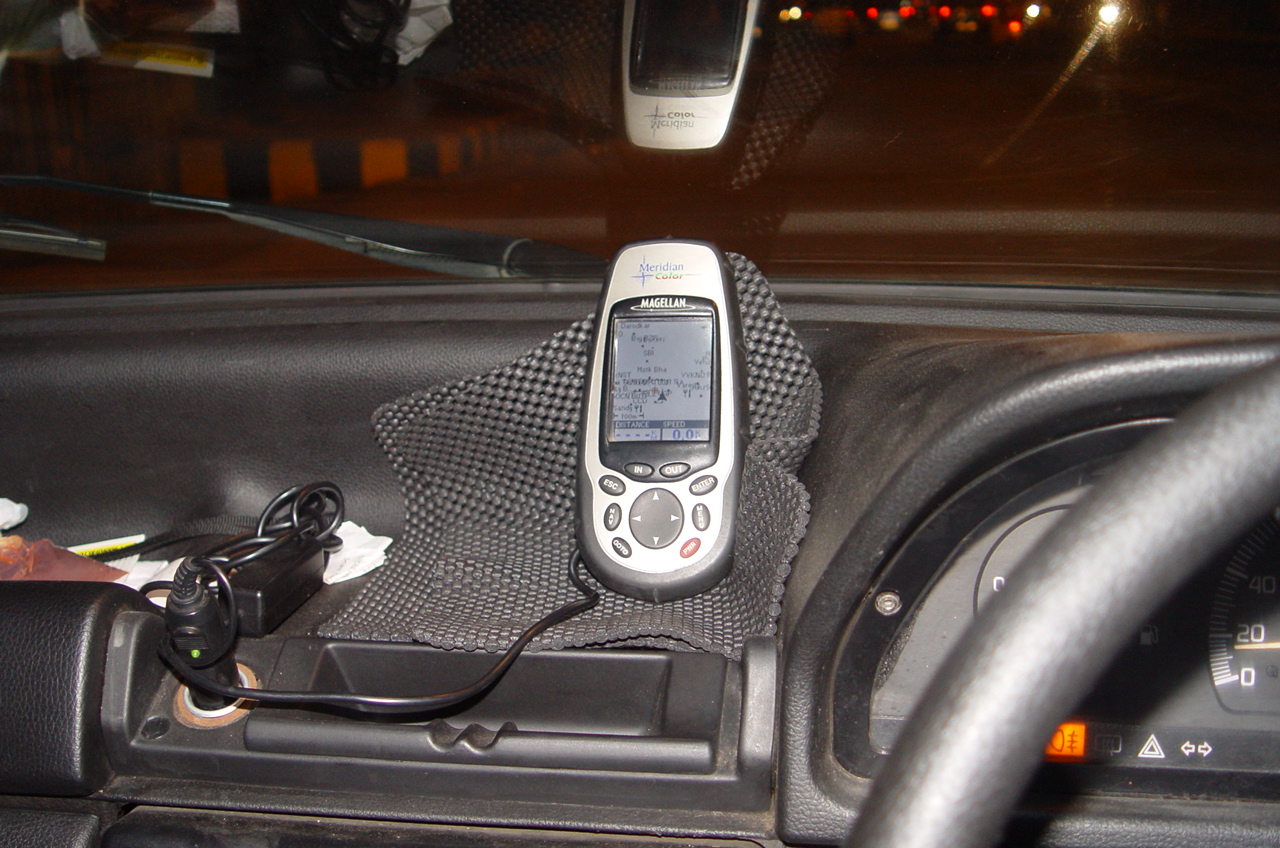
A GPS receiver in civilian automobile use.

Automobiles can be equipped with GNSS receivers at the factory or as aftermarket equipment. Units often display moving maps and information about location, speed, direction, and nearby streets and points of interest.

Heavy equipment can use GNSS in construction, mining and precision agriculture. The blades and buckets of construction equipment are controlled automatically in GNSS-based machine guidance systems. Agricultural equipment may use GNSS to steer automatically, or as a visual aid displayed on a screen for the driver. This is useful for controlled traffic and row crop operations and when spraying. Harvesters with yield monitors can also use GNSS to create a yield map of the paddock being harvested.

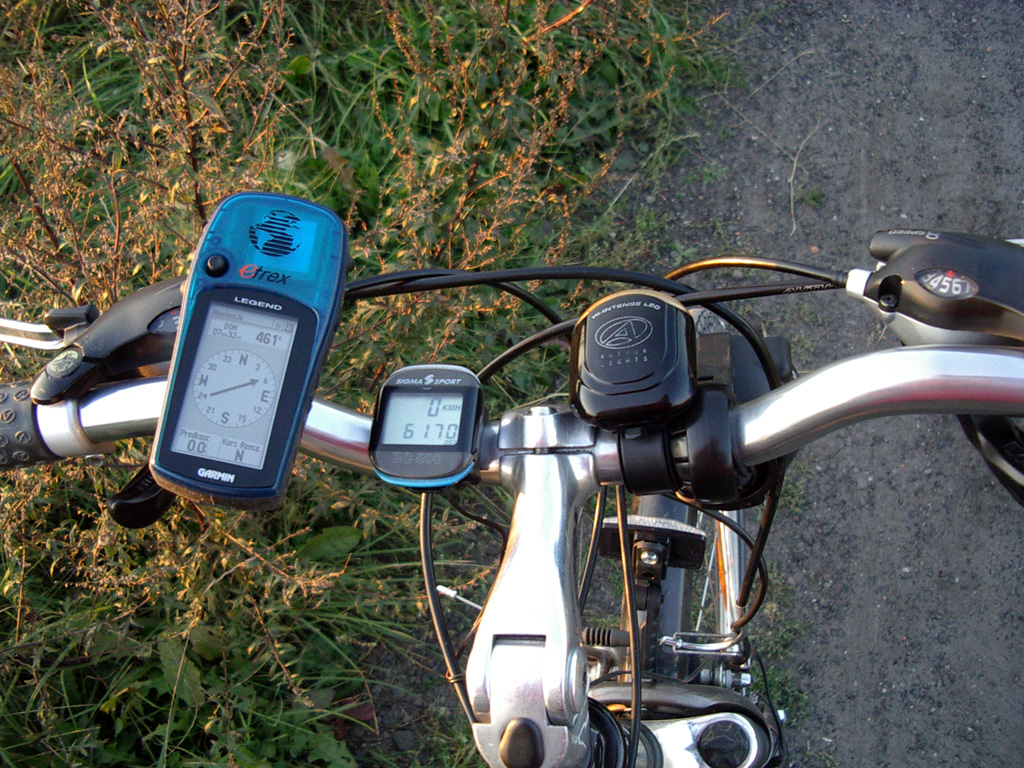
Bicycle with GPS (left) and cyclocomputer

Cyclists often use GNSS in racing and touring. GNSS navigation allows cyclists to plot their course in advance and follow this course, which may include quieter, narrower streets, without having to stop frequently to refer to separate maps. GNSS receivers designed specifically for cycling may include 'street-aware' mapping features, or may be oriented towards recording the progress of the cyclist along the route. This data can be reviewed after the ride to inform the rider's training or competition planning, or uploaded to online services which allow riders to view and compare each other's rides.

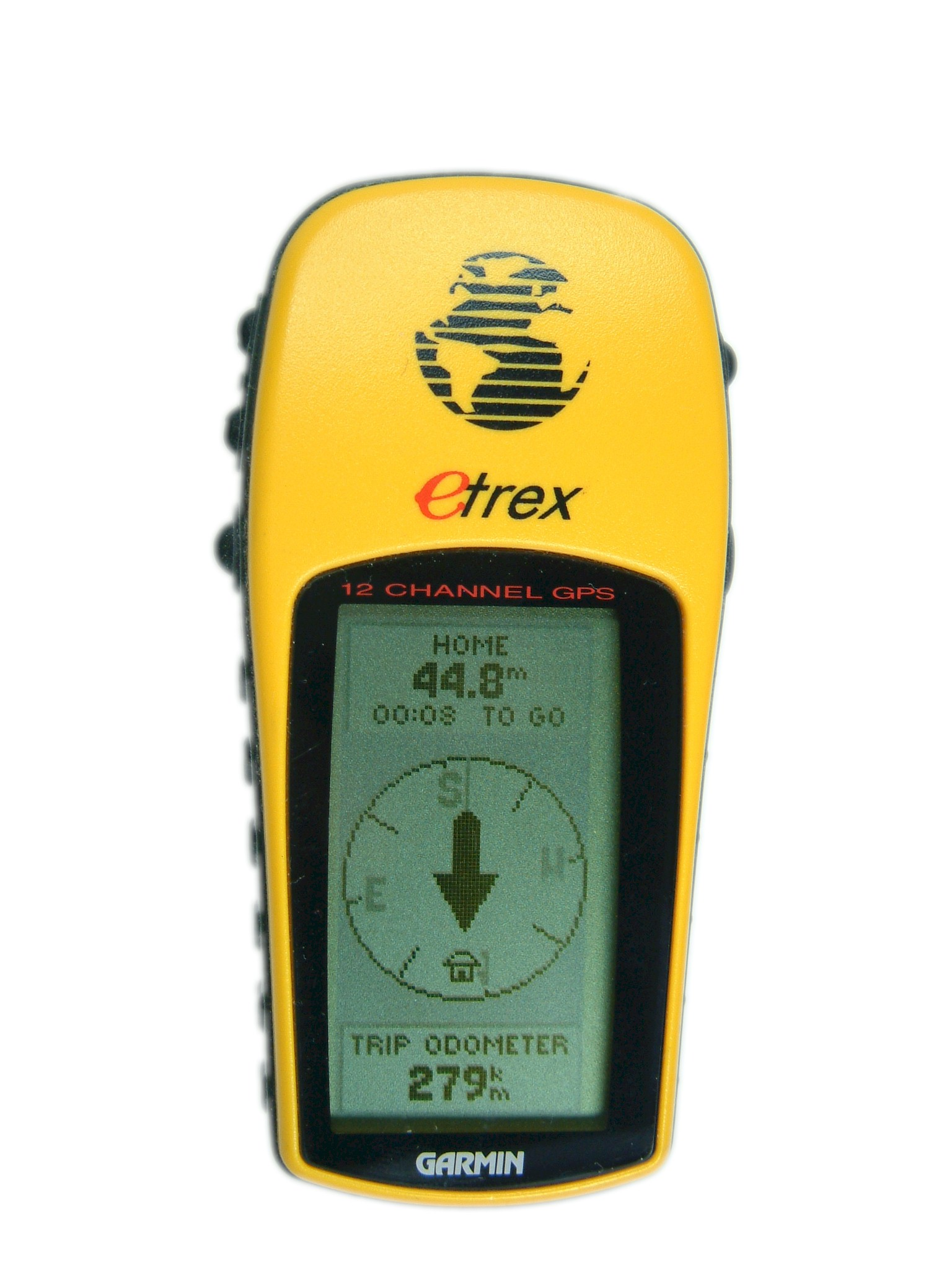
GPS unit showing basic way point and tracking information as typically required for outdoor sport and recreational use

Hikers, climbers, and even ordinary pedestrians in urban or rural environments can use GNSS to determine their position, with or without reference to separate maps. In isolated areas, the ability of GNSS to provide a precise position can greatly enhance the chances of rescue when climbers or hikers are disabled or lost (if they have a means of communication with rescue workers).

GNSS equipment for the visually impaired is available.

=== Over water ===
Boats and ships can use GNSS to navigate all of the world's lakes, seas and oceans. Maritime GNSS units include functions useful on water, such as "man overboard" (MOB) functions that allow instantly marking the location where a person has fallen overboard, which simplifies rescue efforts. GNSS may be connected to the ships self-steering gear and Chartplotters using the NMEA 0183 interface. GNSS can also improve the security of shipping traffic by enabling AIS.

=== Air travel ===
Air navigation systems usually have a moving map display and are often connected to the autopilot for en-route navigation. Cockpit-mounted GNSS receivers and glass cockpits are appearing in general aviation aircraft of all sizes, using technologies such as SBAS or DGPS to increase accuracy. Many are certified for instrument flight rules navigation, and some can also be used for final approach and landing operations as in Joint precision approach and landing system. Glider pilots use GNSS Flight Recorders to log GNSS data verifying their arrival at turn points in gliding competitions, and for information to aid en route decision making for cross-country soaring.

Aircraft passengers: Most airlines allow passenger use of GNSS units on their flights, except during landing and take-off, when other electronic devices are also restricted. Even though consumer GNSS receivers have a minimal risk of interference, a few airlines disallow use of hand-held receivers during flight. Other airlines integrate aircraft tracking into the seat-back television entertainment system, available to all passengers even during takeoff and landing.

=== Spacecraft ===
Spacecraft use GNSS as a navigational and timing tool. The addition of a GNSS receiver to a spacecraft allows precise orbit determination without a ground tracking station. This, in turn, enables autonomous spacecraft navigation, formation flying, and autonomous rendezvous.

The use of GNSS in low Earth orbit and lower sun-synchronous orbit is similar to use on Earth and in air as the powerful main lobe signals of the GNSS satellites can often be received. Orbcomm's constellation on LEO and SSO uses GPS receivers on all satellites. Affordable commercial off-the-shelf (COTS) receivers can be used as well, as demonstrated by China using low-cost COTS GPS/BDS receivers installed on Yaogan-30 (YG30; LEO) series and Fengyun-3C (FY3C; SSO) satellites. The more advanced dual-frequency receiver was precise to 10–15 cm while the cheaper single-frequency receiver was precise to 20 25cm. Using two systems at the same time enhances service availability on the polar orbit (SSO) of FY3C by making more satellites visible. In general, use of GNSS at altitudes less than 3000 km is considered to fall into the terrestrial service volume (TSV).

The use of GNSS in MEO, GEO, HEO, and highly elliptical orbits is more complicated due to reduced visibility of the main lobe. GNSS coverage above the TSV but up to the GEO (36,000 km) is known as the space service volume (SSV). The SSV is in turn divided into the lower SSV and the upper SSV at 8,000 km, the approximate height of GNSS orbits. Lower SSV receivers receive unobstructed views of more satellite's main lobes compared with the TSV; using omnidirectional antennas helps exploit this feature. The high Doppler shifts at lower SSV require adaptation of the positioning algorithm. Upper SSV receivers need to make do with the "spillover" of main lobe signal (i.e. the part not shadowed by Earth) and the much weaker (15 - 20 dB) side-lobe signals as well as deal with periods of no coverage. These design constraints (and possibly the radiation environment found in space) prevent the use of COTS receivers. Use of GNSS in SSV is largely mature.

Use of GNSS beyond the GEO is still experimental. The Magnetospheric Multiscale Mission demonstrated GPS use at 150,000 km altitude in 2018. The Lunar GNSS Receiver Experiment (LuGRE) onboard the Blue Ghost Mission 1 acquired and tracked GPS and Galileo at 400,000 km from Earth, in Lunar orbit. using a high-gain antenna pointing in the direction of Earth. It also acquired a realtime fix on lunar surface. After-the-fact analysis of LuGRE recordings found that other GNSS systems were also captured by the experiment and could be used to improve availability. At lunar distances, the plasmasphere may exert a significant effect on GNSS signals, in addition to the well-known ionospheric delay.

== Surveying and mapping ==
GNSS is used in creation of maps using geographic information systems. Several projects, including OpenStreetMap and TierraWiki, allow users to create maps collaboratively, much like a wiki, using consumer-grade GPS receivers.

=== Geophysics and geology ===
High precision measurements of crustal strain can be made with differential GNSS by finding the relative displacement between GNSS sensors. Multiple stations situated around an actively deforming area (such as a volcano or fault zone) can be used to find strain and ground movement. These measurements can then be used to interpret the cause of the deformation, such as a dike or sill beneath the surface of an active volcano. Real-time GNSS positioning can also be employed as part of earthquake early warning systems.

=== Archaeology ===
As archaeologists excavate a site, they generally make a three-dimensional map of the site, detailing where each artifact is found. High-precision GNSS makes this process simple.

=== Equipment ===
Most mapping grade GNSS receivers use the carrier wave data from only the L1 frequency, but have a precise crystal oscillator which reduces errors related to receiver clock jitter. This allows positioning errors on the order of one meter or less in real-time, with a differential GNSS signal received using a separate radio receiver. By storing the carrier phase measurements and differentially post-processing the data, positioning errors on the order of 10 centimeters are possible with these receivers.

Survey-Grade GNSS receivers can be used to position survey markers, buildings, and road construction. These units use the signal from both the L1 and L2 GPS frequencies. Even though the L2 code data are encrypted, the signal's carrier wave enables correction of some ionospheric errors. These dual-frequency GPS receivers typically cost US$10,000 or more, but can have positioning errors on the order of one centimetre or less when used in carrier phase differential GPS mode. (The advent of L2 L5 civilian service has led to widespread production of L1/L5 and L1/L2 dual-frequency GPS devices.)

Survey-grade GNSS receiver industry include a relatively small number of major players who specialize in the design of complex dual-frequency GNSS receivers capable of precise tracking of carrier phases for all or most of available signals in order to bring the accuracy of relative positioning down to cm-level values required by these applications. The most known companies are Javad, Leica, NovAtel, Septentrio, Topcon and Trimble.

== Other uses ==
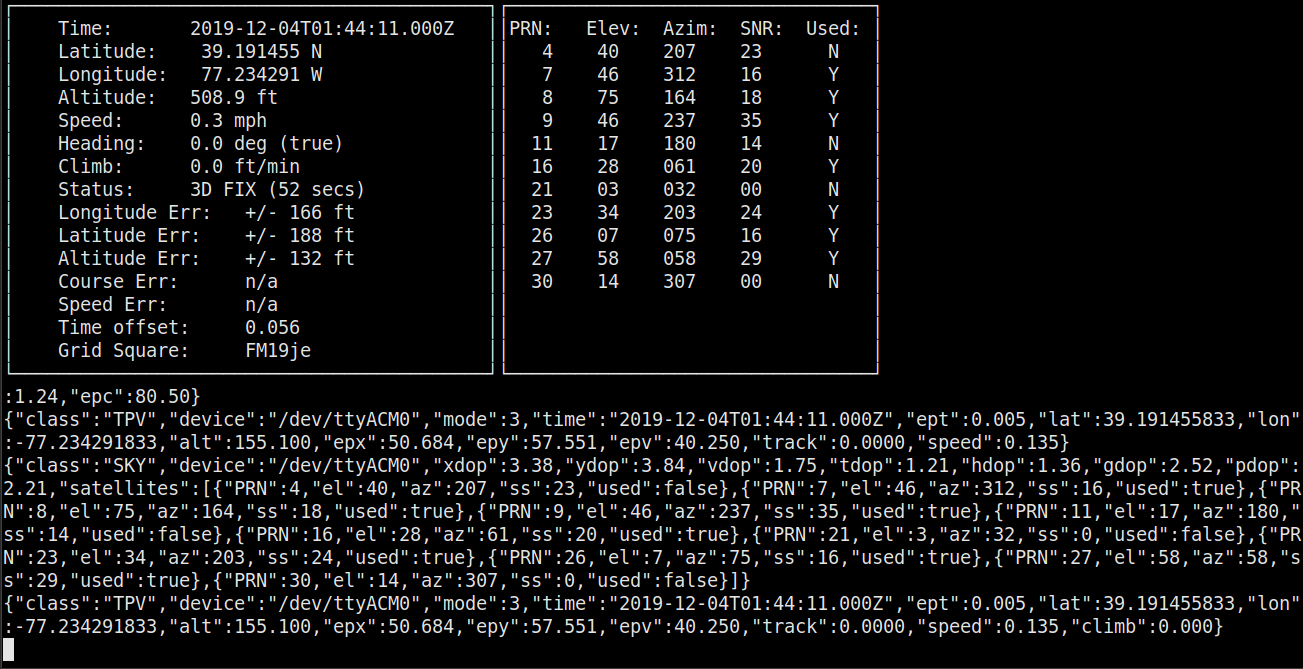
GNSS source used as time reference for NTP clock synchronization, with gpsd

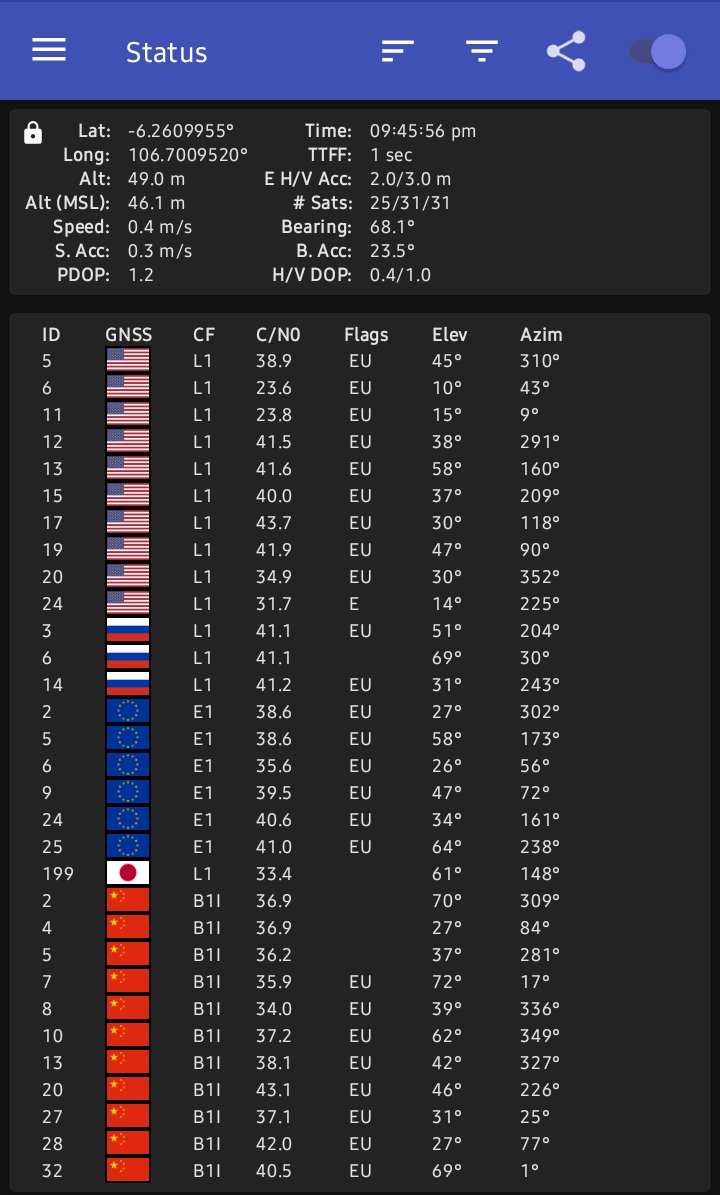
GNSS satellites (GPS, GLONASS, Galileo, and BeiDou) and a GNSS augmentation system (Quasi-Zenith Satellite System) used on a smartphone in South Tangerang, Indonesia (2025)

=== Positioning-based ===
- Military precision-guided munitions – Many types of munitions, including JDAM bombs, Excalibur 155 mm artillery shell, use GNSS to guide them to their target.
- Mobile satellite communications – Satellite communications systems use a directional antenna (usually a "dish") pointed at a satellite. The antenna on a moving ship or train, for example, must be pointed based on its current location. Modern antenna controllers usually incorporate a GNSS receiver to provide this information.
- Emergency and location-based services – GNSS functionality can be used by emergency services to locate cell phones. The ability to locate a mobile phone is required in the United States by E911 emergency services legislation. However, such a system is not in place everywhere. GNSS is less dependent on the telecommunications network topology than radiolocation for compatible phones. Assisted GPS reduces the power requirements of the mobile phone and increases the accuracy of the location. A phone's geographic location may also be used to provide location-based services, including advertising or other location-specific information.
- Location-based games – The availability of hand-held GNSS receivers has led to games such as geocaching, which involves using a hand-held GNSS unit to travel to a specific longitude and latitude to search for objects hidden by other geocachers. This popular activity often includes walking or hiking to natural locations. Geodashing is an outdoor sport using waypoints.
- Skydiving – Most commercial drop zones use a GNSS to aid the pilot to "spot" the plane to the correct position to allow all skydivers on the load to be able to fly their canopies back to the landing area.
- Wreck diving – A popular variant of scuba diving is known as wreck diving. In order to locate the desired shipwreck on the bottom of the ocean floor, GPS is used to navigate to the approximate location, and then the shipwreck is found using an echosounder.
- Social networking – A growing number of companies are marketing cellular phones equipped with GPS technology, offering the ability to pinpoint friends on custom created maps, along with alerts that inform the user when the party is within a programmed range. Not only do many of these phones offer social-networking functions, they offer standard GPS navigation features such as audible voice commands for in-vehicle GPS navigation.

==== Data collection and tagging ====
- Marketing – Some market research companies have combined GIS systems and survey-based research to help companies to decide where to open new branches and to target their advertising according to the usage patterns of roads and the socio-demographic attributes of residential zones.
- Photographic geocoding – Combining GNSS position data with photographs taken with a (typically digital) camera allows to view the photographs on a map or to look up the locations where they were taken in a gazetteer. It is possible to automatically annotate the photographs with the location they depict by integrating a GNSS device into the camera so that co-ordinates are embedded into photographs as Exif metadata. Alternatively, the timestamps of pictures can be correlated with a GNSS track log.
- Wireless networking – A technique of mapping and uploading the exact or accurate location of a wireless network is called wardriving. It uses signal-strength data from the wireless adapter and GPS to identify the location. Kismet for Linux is a widely used wardriving program.

==== Tracking ====
- GPS tracking systems use GNSS to determine the location of a vehicle, person, pet or freight, and to record the position at regular intervals in order to create a log of movements. The data can be stored inside the unit or sent to a remote computer by radio or cellular modem. Some systems allow the location to be viewed in real time on the Internet with a web browser.
- Monitoring the whereabouts of convicted sex offenders, using a GPS anklet as a condition of parole. Law-enforcement officials can review the daily movements of offenders for a cost of only $5 or $10 per day. Real-time, or instant, tracking is considered too costly for GPS tracking of criminals.
- Geo-fences can enable or disable devices based on their location.
- GNSS road pricing systems charge of road users using data from GNSS sensors inside vehicles. Advocates argue that road pricing using GNSS permits a number of policies such as tolling by distance on urban roads and can be used for many other applications in parking, insurance and vehicle emissions. Critics argue that GNSS could lead to an invasion of people’s privacy.

=== Non-positioning-based ===
- Precise time reference – Many systems that must be accurately synchronized use GNSS as a source of accurate time. GNSS can be used as a reference clock for time code generators or Network Time Protocol (NTP) time servers. Sensors (for seismology or other monitoring application) can use GNSS as a precise time source. Time-division multiple access (TDMA) communications networks often rely on this precise timing to synchronize RF generating equipment, network equipment, and multiplexers.
- Heading information – The GNSS can be used to determine heading information, even though it was not designed for this purpose. A "GNSS compass" uses a pair of antennas separated by about 50 cm to detect the phase difference in the carrier signal from a particular GNSS satellite. Given the positions of the satellite, the position of the antenna, and the phase difference, the orientation of the two antennas can be computed. More expensive GNSS compass systems use three antennas in a triangle to get three separate readings with respect to each satellite. A GNSS compass is not subject to magnetic declination as a magnetic compass is and does not need to be reset periodically like a gyrocompass. It is, however, subject to multipath effects.
- Weather prediction (GNSS radio occultation) – Measurement of atmospheric bending of GNSS satellite signals by specialized GNSS receivers in orbital satellites can be used to determine atmospheric conditions such as air density, temperature, moisture and electron density. Such information from a set of six micro-satellites, launched in April 2006, called the Constellation of Observing System for Meteorology, Ionosphere and Climate COSMIC has been proven to improve the accuracy of weather prediction models.
