= Construction surveying =

Providing control of layout during building

Construction surveying or building surveying (otherwise known as "staking", "stake-out", "lay-out", or "setting-out") is to provide dimensional control for all stages of construction work, including the stake out of reference points and markers that will guide the construction of new structures such as roads, rail, or buildings. These markers are usually staked out according to a suitable coordinate system selected for the project.

== History ==
- The nearly perfect squareness and north–south orientation of the Great Pyramid of Giza, built c. 2700 BC, affirm the Egyptians' command of surveying.
- A recent reassessment of Stonehenge (c.2500 BC) suggests that the monument was set out by prehistoric surveyors using peg and rope geometry.
- In the sixth century BC geometric based techniques were used to construct the tunnel of Eupalinos on the island of Samos.
- Modern technology advanced surveying's accuracy and efficiency. For example, surveyors used to use two posts joined with a chain to measure distance. This technology could only account for distance and not elevation. Current technology uses Global Navigation Satellite Systems (GNSS) that can measure the distance from point A to point B as well as differences in elevation.

== Principles ==
- Survey existing conditions of the future work site, including topography, existing buildings and infrastructure, and underground infrastructure whenever possible (for example, measuring invert elevations and diameters of sewers at manholes)
- Stake out lot corners, stake limit of work and stake location of construction trailer (clear of all excavation and construction)
- Stake out reference points and markers that will guide the construction of new structures
- Verify the location of structures during construction
- Provide horizontal control on multiple floors
- Conduct an As-Built survey: a survey conducted at the end of the construction project to verify that the work authorized was completed to the specifications set on plans

== Coordinate systems used in construction ==
Land surveys and surveys of existing conditions are generally performed according to geodesic coordinates. However, for the purposes of construction a more suitable coordinate system will often be used. During construction surveying, the surveyor will often have to convert from geodesic coordinates to the coordinate system used for that project.

=== Chainage or station ===
In the case of roads or other linear infrastructure, a chainage (derived from Gunter's Chain - 1 chain is equal to 66 feet or 100 links) will be established, often to correspond with the centre line of the road or pipeline. During construction, structures would then be located in terms of chainage, offset and elevation. Offset is said to be "left" or "right" relative to someone standing on the chainage line who is looking in the direction of increasing chainage. Plans would often show plan views (viewed from above), profile views (a "transparent" section view collapsing all section views of the road parallel to the chainage) or cross-section views (a "true" section view perpendicular to the chainage). In a plan view, chainage generally increases from left to right, or from the bottom to the top of the plan. Profiles are shown with the chainage increasing from left to right, and cross-sections are shown as if the viewer is looking in the direction of increasing chainage (so that the "left" offset is to the left and the "right" offset is to the right).

"Chainage" may also be referred to as "Station".

=== Building grids ===
In the case of buildings, an arbitrary system of grids is often established so as to correspond to the rows of columns and the major load-bearing walls of the building. The grids may be identified alphabetically in one direction, and numerically in the other direction (as in a road map). The grids are usually but not necessarily perpendicular, and are often but not necessarily evenly spaced. Floors and basement levels are also numbered. Structures, equipment or architectural details may be located in reference to the floor and the nearest intersection of the arbitrary axes.

=== Low distortion engineering grids ===
Typically national mapping grids have significant distortion and are often not suitable for precise engineering design and construction. For major infrastructure projects specifically designed low distortion engineering grids can be used, an example being the Transport for London London Survey Grid, or tailored snake projections which can be suitable for long linear infrastructure such as high speed rail. Such grids not only minimise the impact of distortion due to the Earth's curvature but also have the benefit of defined relationships to a geodetic datum and therefore lack the arbitrary nature of localized grids.

=== Other coordinate systems ===
In other types of construction projects, arbitrary "plan north" reference lines may be established, using Cartesian coordinates that may or may not necessarily correspond to true coordinates. The technique is called localized grid. This method uses the plan building grids as their own ordinates. A point of beginning is established at the southwest cross grid, e.g. [N1000.000,E3000.000]. The grids are added together heading north and east to make each line its own ordinate.

== Equipment and techniques ==
Surveying equipment, such as levels and theodolites, are used for accurate measurement of angular deviation, horizontal, vertical and slope distances. With computerisation, electronic distance measurement (EDM), total stations, GNSS surveying and laser scanning have supplemented (and to a large extent supplanted) the traditional optical instruments.

The builder's level measures neither horizontal nor vertical angles. It simply combines a spirit level and telescope to allow the user to visually establish a line of sight along a level plane. When used together with a graduated staff it can be used to transfer elevations from one location to another. An alternative method to transfer elevation is to use water in a transparent hose as the level of the water in the hose at opposite ends will be at the same elevation. A double right angle prism verifies grid patterns, isolating layout errors.

=== Survey stakes ===
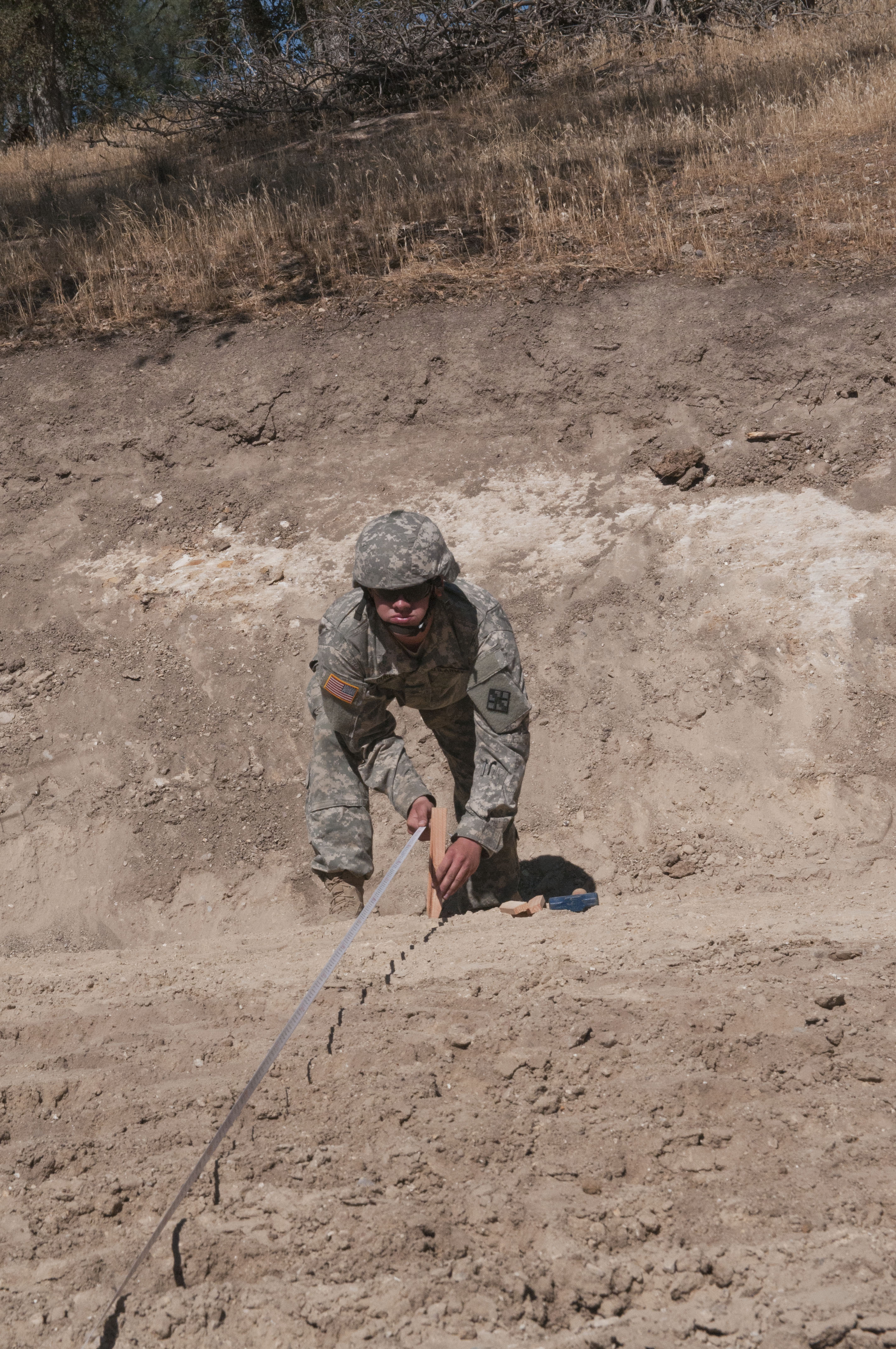
A soldier checks the distance between stakes

Control of alignment and grade during construction may be established through the use of survey stakes. Stakes are generally made of wood in different sizes. Based on the use of the stake they are called alignment stakes, offset stakes, grade stakes, and slope stakes.

Survey stakes are markers surveyors use in surveying projects to prepare job sites, mark out property boundaries, and provide information about claims on natural resources like timber and minerals. The stakes can be made from wood, metal, plastic, and other materials and typically come in a range of sizes and colors for different purposes. Sources can include surveying and construction suppliers, and people can also make or order their own for custom applications.

A survey stake is typically small, with a pointed end to make it easy to drive into the earth. It may be color-coded or have a space for people to write information on the stake. Surveyors use stakes when assessing sites to mark out boundaries, record data, and convey information to other people. On a job site, for example, survey stakes indicate where it is necessary to backfill with soil to raise the elevation, or to cut soil away to lower it. Stakes can also provide information about slope and grading for people getting a job site ready for construction.

== Mining and tunnelling ==
Total stations are the primary survey instrument used in mining surveying.

A total station is used to record the absolute location of the tunnel walls' (stopes), ceilings (backs), and floors as the drifts of an underground mine are driven. The recorded data is then downloaded into a CAD programme, and compared to the designed layout of the tunnel.

The survey party installs control stations at regular intervals. These are small steel plugs installed in pairs in holes drilled into walls or the back. For wall stations, two plugs are installed in opposite walls, forming a line perpendicular to the drift. For back stations, two plugs are installed in the back, forming a line parallel to the drift.

A set of plugs can be used to locate the total station set up in a drift or tunnel by processing measurements to the plugs by intersection and resection.

== Profession ==
Building Surveying emerged in the early 1970s as a profession in the United Kingdom by a group of technically minded General Practice Surveyors.

It was first recognized as a separate discipline within the RICS in 1973 with the first degree-level course the four-year Diploma in Building Surveying (DipBS) at the Glasgow College of Building and Printing which began in 1972. A course at Reading University followed shortly after. It is also recognised in Australia where, due to risk mitigation/limitation factors the employment of surveyors at all levels of the construction industry is widespread. There are still many countries where it is not widely recognized as a profession. The Services that Building Surveyors undertake are broad but include:

- Construction design and building works
- Project Management and monitoring
- CDM Co-ordinator under the Construction (Design & Management) Regulations 2015
- Property Legislation adviser
- Insurance assessment and claims assistance
- Defect investigation and maintenance adviser
- Building Surveys and measured surveys
- Handling Planning applications
- Building Inspection to ensure compliance with building regulations
- Undertaking pre-acquisition surveys
- Negotiating dilapidations claims

Building Surveyors also advise on many aspects of construction including:

- design
- maintenance
- repair
- refurbishment
- restoration
- conservation

Clients of a building surveyor can be the public sector, Local Authorities, Government Departments as well as private sector organisations and work closely with architects, planners, homeowners and tenants groups. Building Surveyors may also be called to act as an expert witness. It is usual for building surveyors to undertake an accredited degree qualification before undertaking structured training to become a member of a professional organisation. For Chartered Building Surveyors, these courses are accredited by the Royal Institution of Chartered Surveyors. Other professional organisations that have building surveyor members include CIOB, ABE, HKIS and RICS.

With the enlargement of the European community, the profession of the Chartered Building Surveyor is becoming more widely known in other European states, particularly France. Chartered Building Surveyors, where many English speaking people buy second homes.

=== Distinction from land surveyors ===
In the United States, Canada, the United Kingdom and most Commonwealth countries land surveying is considered to be a distinct profession. Land surveyors have their own professional associations and licensing requirements. The services of a licensed land surveyor are generally required for boundary (also known as cadastral) surveys for

- creating new boundaries sanctioned by landowners by way of subdivision plans or plats, and for
- relocating the boundaries of existing land parcels using legal descriptions, registered documents, surveyors' field notes and plans, and evidence of monumentation and other marks on or under ground.

== See also ==
- Civil Engineering – Engineering discipline focused on physical infrastructure
- Engineering Drawing – Type of technical drawing used to define requirements for engineered items
- Surveying – Science of determining the positions of points and the distances and angles between them
- Chartered Surveyor – Real estate professional
- List of surveying instruments
