= Robert (crater) =

Crater on the Moon

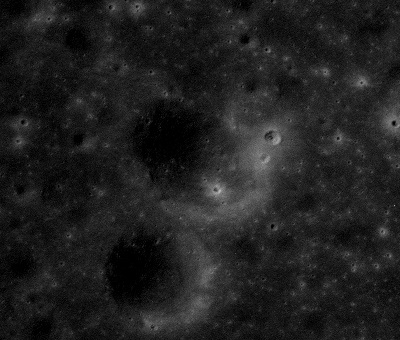
- Oblique Apollo 17 image, facing south
- Coordinates: 19.03°N 27.45°E
- Diameter: 0.56 km
- Colongitude: 323° at sunrise
- Eponym: English masculine name

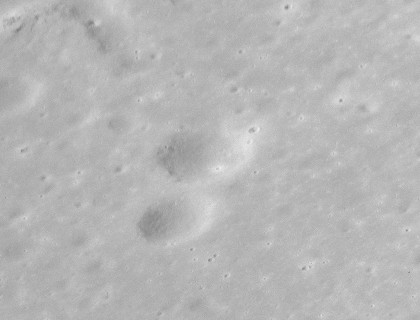
Oblique view from Apollo 15

Robert is a tiny lunar impact crater in the southeastern part of the Mare Serenitatis. It is located to the northeast of the small crater Dawes, and to the west of the Montes Taurus range. To the east-northeast of this position is the landing site of the Apollo 17 mission, in the Taurus–Littrow valley.

The name of the crater was approved by the IAU in 1976. It does not refer to a specific person, Robert is an English male given name.
