= Jerik (crater) =

Crater on the Moon

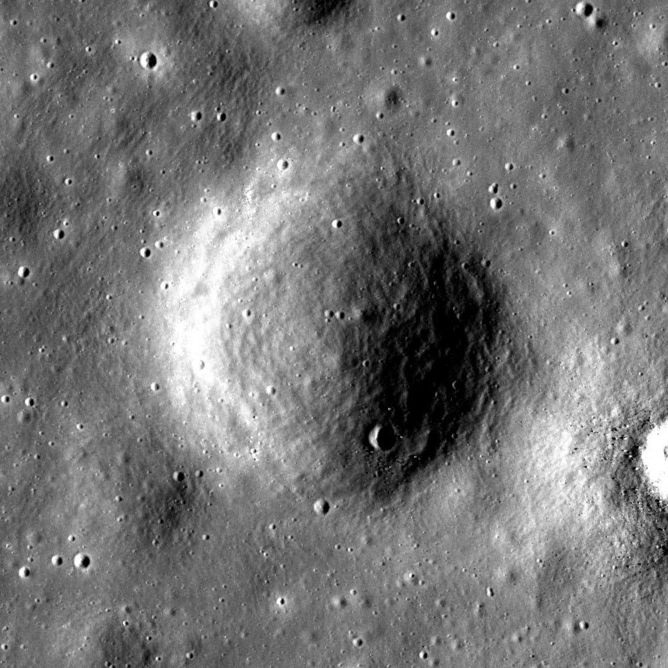
- Jerik crater, from the photo taken by the LRO (Lunar Reconnaissance Orbiter) in 2012
- Coordinates: 18.53°N 27.63°E
- Diameter: 0.63 km
- Depth: Unknown
- Colongitude: 323° at sunrise
- Eponym: Scandinavian masculine name

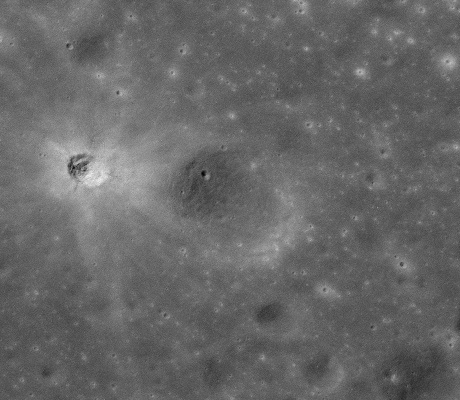
Oblique Apollo 17 image, facing south

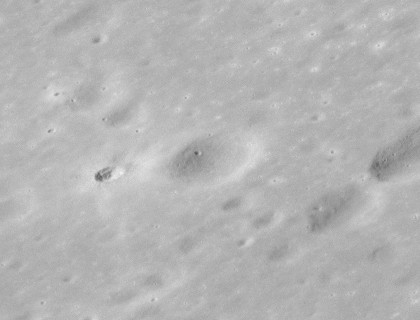
Oblique view from Apollo 15

Jerik is a tiny lunar impact crater in the southeastern part of the Mare Serenitatis. It is located to the northeast of the small crater Dawes, and to the west of the Montes Taurus range. To the east-northeast of this position is the landing site of the Apollo 17 mission, in the Taurus–Littrow valley.

Next to Jerik is an even smaller (~100 m), unnamed crater with a bright ray system. The name of the crater was approved by the IAU in 1976, and refers to a Scandinavian male given name.
