= Blue Ghost Mission 1 =

2025 lunar landing mission

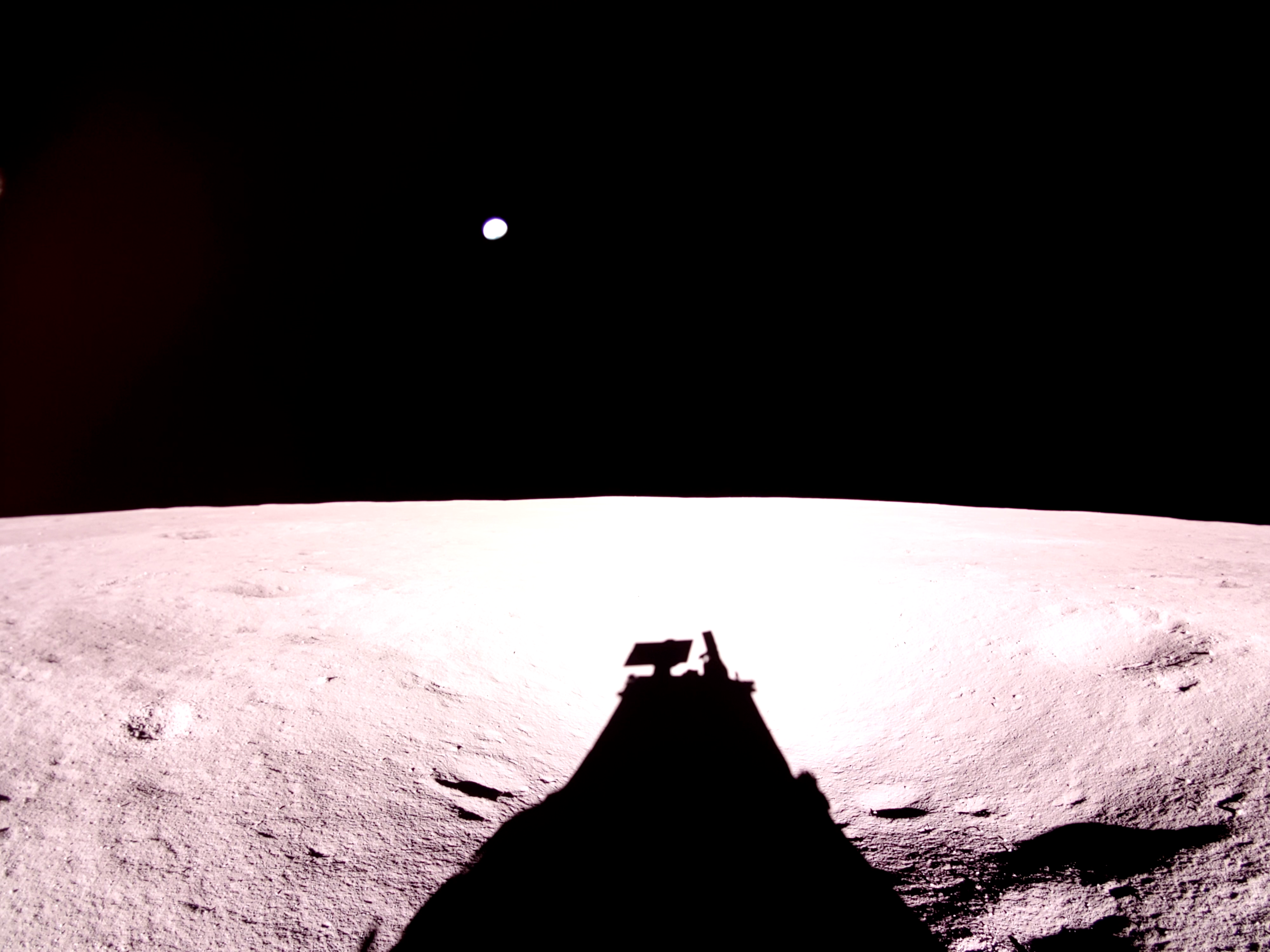
- View from Blue Ghost M1 on the Moon
- Names: CLPS TO 19D; "Ghost Riders in the Sky"
- Mission type: Lunar landing
- Operator: Firefly Aerospace
- COSPAR ID: 2025-010A
- SATCAT no.: 62716
- Mission duration: 2 months and 1 day

Spacecraft properties
- Spacecraft type: Blue Ghost
- Manufacturer: Firefly Aerospace
- Launch mass: 1,517 kg (3,344 lb)
- BOL mass: 1,469 kg (3,239 lb)
- Dry mass: 469 kg (1,034 lb)
- Dimensions: Height: 2 m (6 ft 7 in); Width: 3.5 m (11 ft)
- Power: 400 watts

Start of mission
- Launch date: January 15, 2025, 1:11:39 am EST (06:11:39 UTC)
- Rocket: Falcon 9 Block 5 (B1085‑5), Flight 425
- Launch site: Kennedy, LC-39A
- Contractor: SpaceX

End of mission
- Last contact: March 16, 2025, 23:25 UTC

Lunar lander
- Landing date: March 2, 2025, 08:34 UTC
- Landing site: Mare Crisium near Mons Latreille; 18.56°N 61.81°E
- Mission insignia Firefly Aerospace Blue Ghost Commercial Lunar Payload Services

Blue Ghost Mission 1 was a robotic Moon landing mission conducted by Firefly Aerospace (Firefly). The spacecraft soft-landed on the lunar surface on March 2, 2025, making Firefly the first commercial company to complete a fully successful soft landing on the Moon. As part of NASA's Commercial Lunar Payload Services program, the mission delivered ten scientific and technological experiments to advance future human exploration under the Artemis program. About 5 hours after lunar sunset on March 16, 2025, the solar-powered lander's batteries depleted and communications were lost. The mission's end was officially declared at 23:25 UTC.

The Blue Ghost lunar lander was launched from Kennedy Space Center on January 15, 2025, using a SpaceX Falcon 9 Block 5 rocket that also carried the Hakuto-R Mission 2 lander. At 08:34 UTC on March 2, 2025, it delivered 10 payloads to the lunar surface within Mare Crisium, a 500-kilometer-wide (310 mi) lunar basin. Its 60-day mission aimed to analyze lunar regolith, study geophysical characteristics, and investigate interactions between the solar wind and Earth's magnetic field. The lander's scientific payloads included a regolith adherence characterization experiment, a lunar retroreflector for precision distance measurements, a radiation-tolerant computer, thermal exploration probes, and more.

All 10 NASA payloads (including GNSS tracking, heliospheric X-ray imaging, magnetotelluric sounder, and a radiation‑tolerant computer) powered on, collected data, and transmitted over 110 GB back to Earth.

== Mission ==
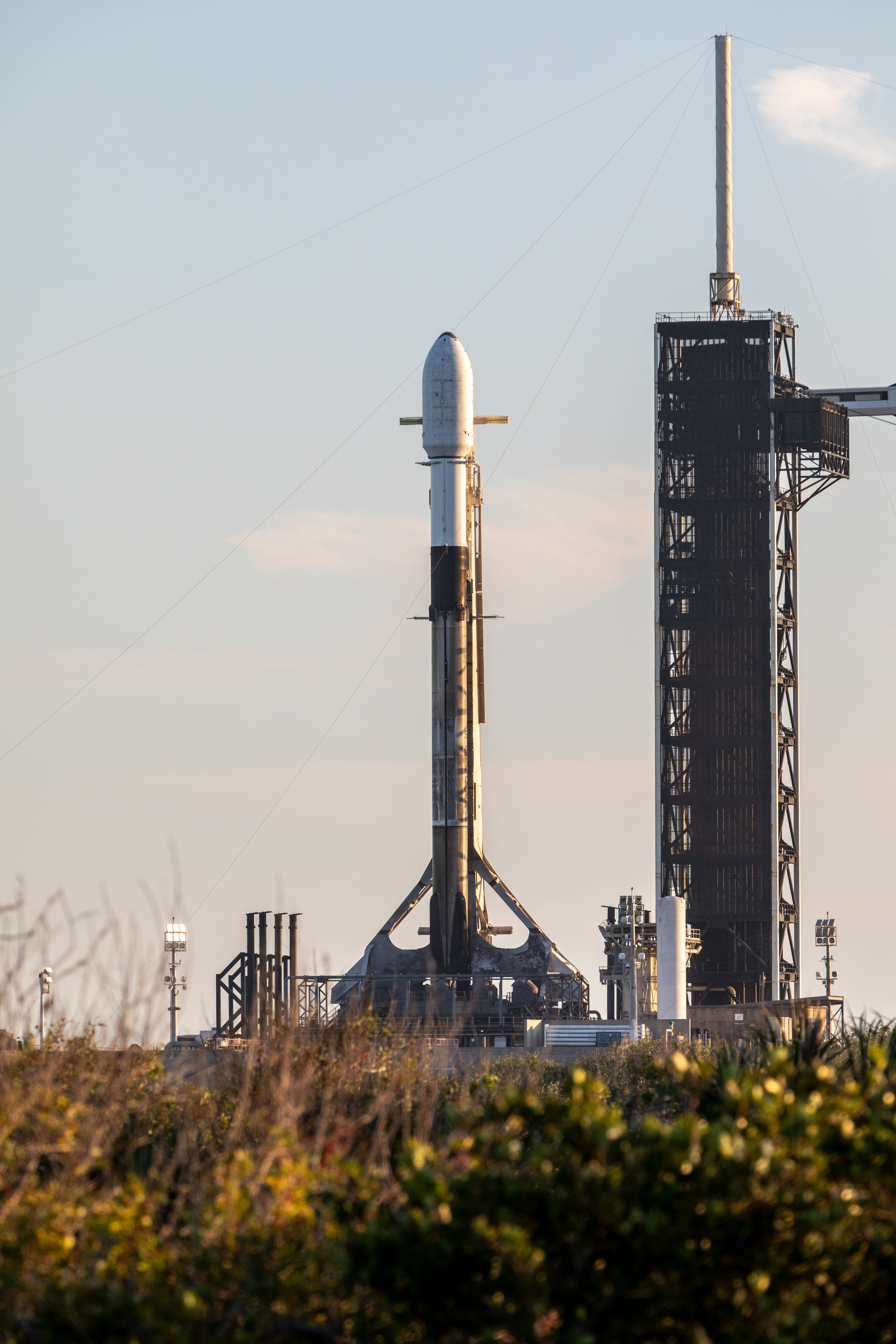
Falcon 9 rocket at Kennedy Space Center shortly before the launch of Blue Ghost Mission 1 and Hakuto-R Mission 2

On February 4, 2021, NASA awarded Firefly a US$93.3 million contract to deliver ten science investigations and technology demonstrations to the Moon in 2023. The award was part of NASA's Commercial Lunar Payload Services (CLPS), a contract vehicle used to pay companies to quickly land science and technology payloads on the lunar surface as part of the Artemis program.

On May 20, 2021, Firefly announced its selection of SpaceX's Falcon 9 Block 5 as the launch vehicle for the inaugural Blue Ghost lunar lander mission. This decision was made due to the Falcon 9's performance and payload capacity, which Firefly's Alpha rocket could not provide. The company indicated that its future Eclipse vehicle (then named "Firefly Beta") would be used in subsequent Blue Ghost missions.

Development milestones for the Blue Ghost lander progressed over the following years. On April 26, 2022, Firefly completed the Integration Readiness Review for the lander, with a tentative launch date set for 2024. In November 2023, Firefly refined the schedule, specifying a launch window between the third and fourth quarters of 2024.

By May 2024, the Nammo UK LEROS 4-ET engines for Blue Ghost were completed, and their integration into the lander was confirmed in June. Firefly announced that preparations were proceeding as planned, with the company reaffirming a Q4 2024 launch target in July. Environmental testing of the lander commenced in August at NASA's Jet Propulsion Laboratory (JPL), ensuring the spacecraft's readiness for flight.

In November 2024, Firefly announced that the Blue Ghost lander was fully prepared for launch, setting a mid-January 2025 launch date. Payload encapsulation was completed on January 10, marking one of the final steps in the pre-launch sequence. On January 15, 2025, the Blue Ghost lander successfully launched from Kennedy Space Center Launch Complex 39A at 06:11:39 UTC (1:11:39 a.m.EST, local time at the launch site) aboard a SpaceX Falcon 9 Block 5 rocket. The mission also included Hakuto-R Mission 2 as a co-manifested payload, and the Falcon 9 rocket, which carried both spacecraft, later collided with the Moon a year after.

The spacecraft orbited Earth for 25 days, before performing a trans-lunar injection maneuver, followed four days later by a lunar orbit insertion burn to capture the spacecraft into lunar orbit. After a further 16 days in lunar orbit, on March 2, 2025, at 2:34 a.m. CST, the spacecraft performed a powered descent and successfully landed on the lunar surface northwest of Mons Latreille. Firefly thus became the first commercial company to execute a fully successful soft-landing of a spacecraft on the Moon. Three solar panels powered the lander's research instruments and Spacecraft bus during that time.

== Hardware ==
Blue Ghost featured in-house manufactured composite decks, struts, landing legs, and footpads. Its thermal control system used a combination of heaters, temperature sensors, and multi-layer insulation. The onboard avionics and batteries were designed and built by Firefly, while the solar panels from subcontractor SolAero By Rocket Lab provide a maximum of 400 watts of power. ASI by Rocket Lab provided ground and flight software, trajectory design, orbit determination, and software testbed integration. Blue Ghost featured a Nammo LEROS-4 main engine, eight smaller Firefly Spectre biprop thrusters, and four sets of Firefly cold-gas attitude control system thrusters. The spacecraft featured both S band and X band radios and communicated with Swedish Space Corporation ground stations over the course of the mission. Two Firefly gimbals provided pointing for the X-band antenna, LuGRE antenna, LEXI telescope, and NGLR retroreflector. Firefly also performed vehicle integration in its Cedar Park, Texas cleanroom facility and, following integration, at the Jet Propulsion Laboratory thermal vacuum chamber.

Firefly asserts that its in-house end-to-end manufacturing and testing of the Blue Ghost structure is a differentiator among the CLPS landers.

== Payloads ==
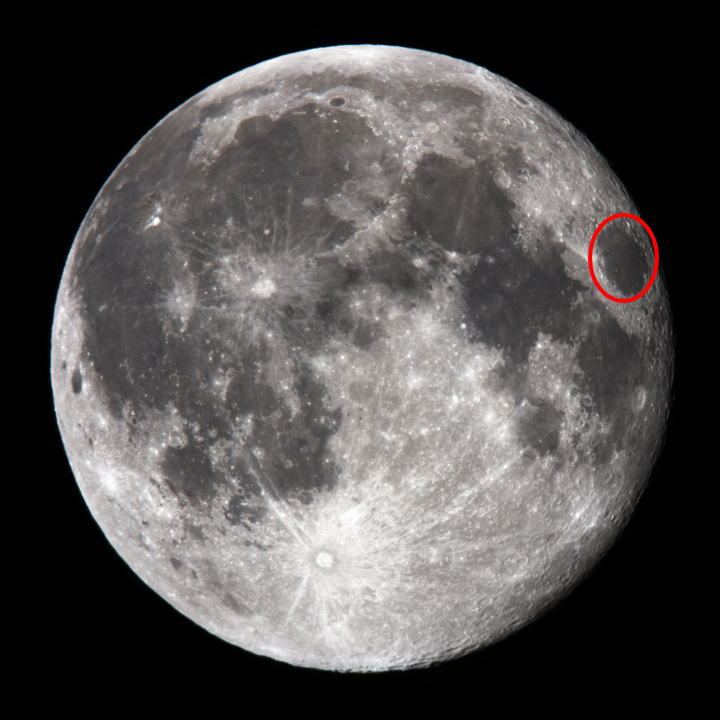
Location of Mare Crisium on the Moon, highlighted in red

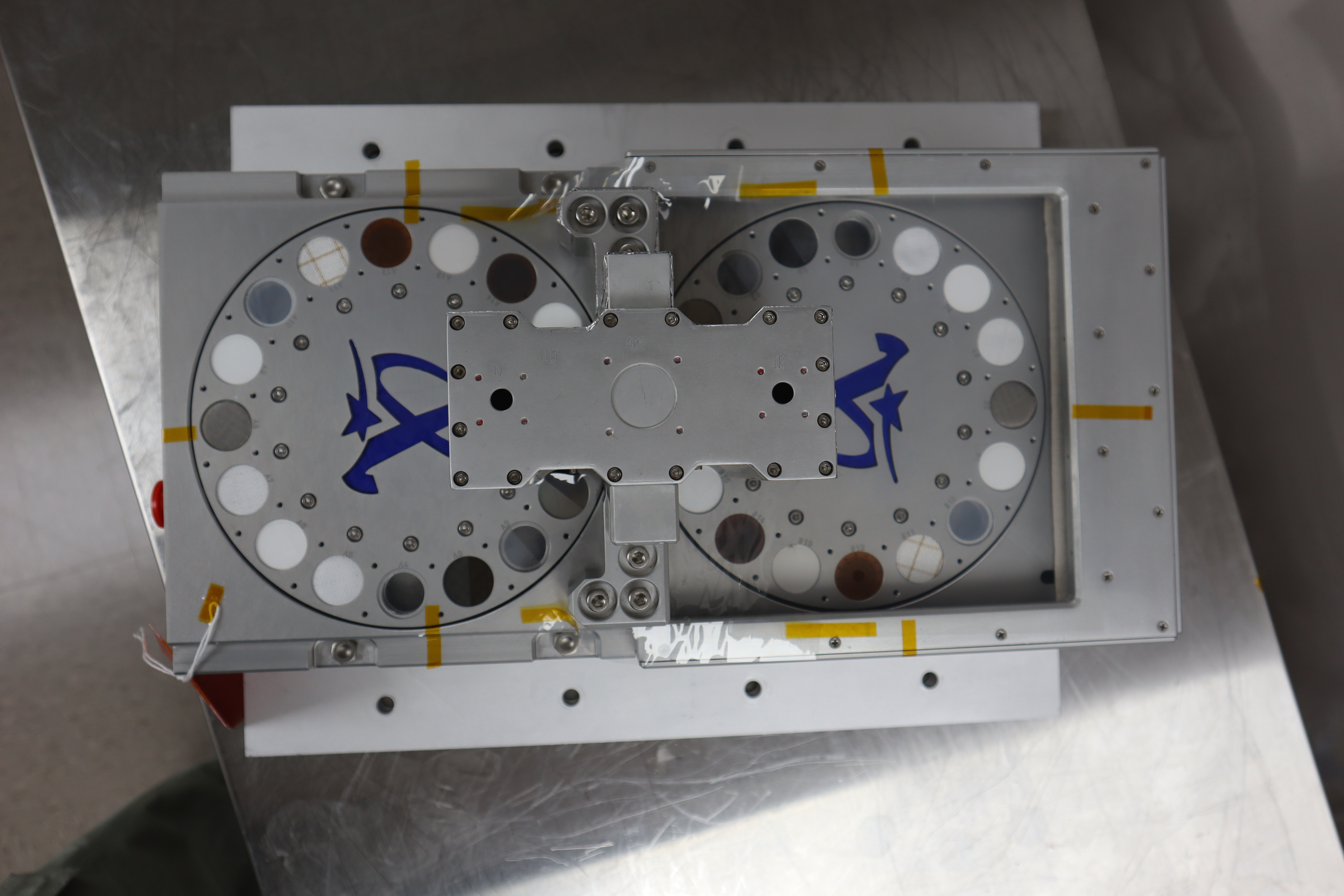
Regolith Adherence Characterization (RAC) payload

The mission landed at Mare Crisium, a 500-kilometer-wide (310 mi) basin visible from Earth. The lander's scientific instruments collected data on the properties of the Moon's regolith—its loose, fragmented rock and soil—as well as its geophysical characteristics and the interactions between the solar wind and Earth's magnetic field. These findings will contribute to the preparation and planning of future human missions to the lunar surface.

The payloads, collectively totaling about 94 kilograms (207 lb) in mass, include:

- The Regolith Adherence Characterization (RAC) determined to what degree the abrasive lunar regolith sticks to, or is repelled by, a range of materials, e.g., solar cells, optical systems, coatings, and sensors; the diverse components are derived from the MISSE-FF facility currently on the International Space Station (ISS).
- The Next Generation Lunar Retroreflectors (NGLR) will serve as a target for lasers on Earth to precisely measure the distance between Earth and the Moon. The retroreflector that flew on this mission will also provide data that could be used to understand various aspects of the lunar interior and address fundamental physics questions.
- The Lunar Environment Heliospheric X-ray Imager (LEXI), which captured images of the interaction of Earth's magnetosphere with the flow of charged particles from the Sun, called the solar wind. This component was designed by the Boston University College of Engineering to observe a ten-day period that included a total solar eclipse before freezing.
- The Reconfigurable, Radiation Tolerant Computer System (RadPC) aimed to demonstrate a radiation-tolerant computing technology. Due to the Moon's lack of atmosphere and magnetic field, radiation from the Sun will be a challenge for electronics. This investigation also characterized the effects of radiation on the lunar surface.
- The Lunar Magnetotelluric Sounder (LMS) was designed to characterize the structure and composition of the Moon's mantle by studying electric and magnetic fields. For this, it launched electrodes across about 700 square meters of terrain.
- The Lunar Instrumentation for Subsurface Thermal Exploration with Rapidity (LISTER) was designed to measure heat flow from the interior of the Moon. The probe attempted to drill 2.1 to 3.0 meters (7 to 10 ft) into the lunar regolith to investigate the Moon's thermal properties at different depths.
- The Lunar PlanetVac (LPV) was designed to acquire lunar regolith from the surface and transfer it to other instruments that would analyze the material or put it in a container that another spacecraft could return to Earth.
- Stereo CAmeras for Lunar Plume Surface Studies (SCALPSS 1.1) captured video and still images of the area under the lander from when the engine plume first disturbs the lunar surface through engine shutdown. Long-focal-length cameras will determine the pre-landing surface topography. Photogrammetry will be used to reconstruct the changing surface during landing. Understanding the physics of rocket exhaust on the regolith and the displacement of dust, gravel, and rocks is critical to understanding how to avoid kicking up surface materials during the terminal phase of flight/landing on the Moon and other celestial bodies.
- The Electrodynamic Dust Shield (EDS) generated a non-uniform electric field using varying high voltage on multiple electrodes. This traveling field, in turn, carries away the particles and has potential applications in thermal radiators, spacesuit fabrics, visors, camera lenses, solar panels, and numerous other technologies.
- The Lunar GNSS Receiver Experiment, which successfully received and used GPS and Galileo signals at lunar distances (in cis-lunar space and on the lunar surface), thus proving the viability of the use of GNSS signals beyond the current limits of the space service volume.

== See also ==
- Chandrayaan-3
- Commercial Lunar Payload Services
- List of missions to the Moon
- Luna 25
- Peregrine Mission One
- Smart Lander for Investigating Moon
- Yutu-2, solar-powered lunar rover designed to survive multiple lunar nights
- Blue Ghost Mission 2
