= Osiris (lunar crater) =

Crater on the Moon

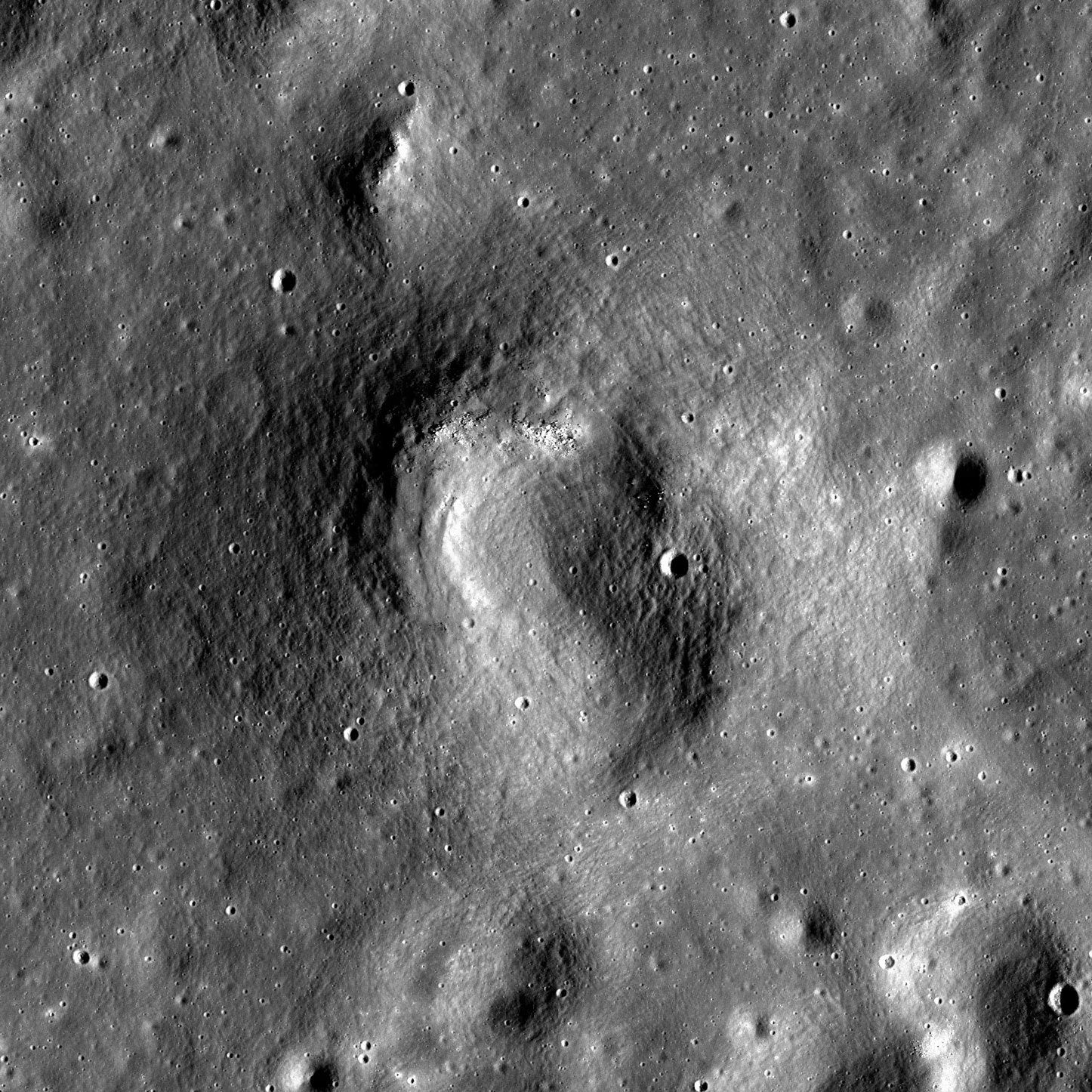
- LRO image
- Coordinates: 18.65°N 27.65°E
- Diameter: 1 km
- Depth: Unknown
- Colongitude: 323° at sunrise
- Eponym: Osiris

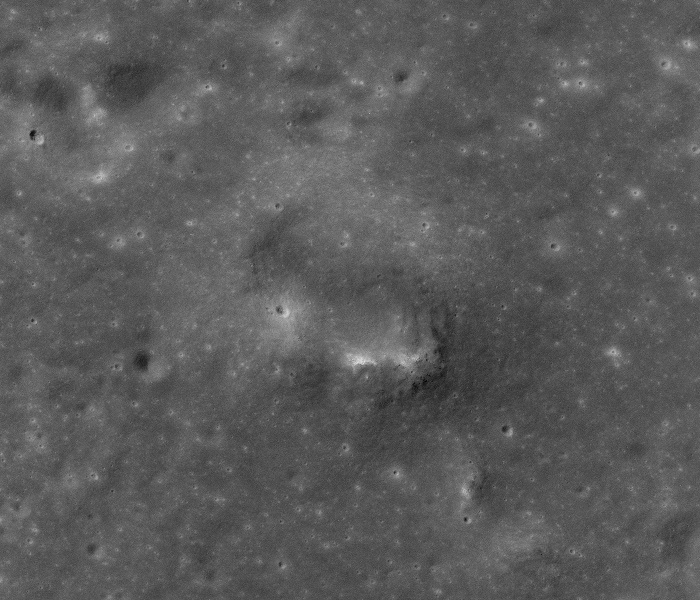
Somewhat oblique Apollo 17 image, facing south

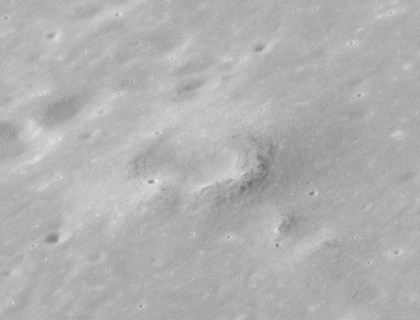
Oblique view from Apollo 15

Osiris is a tiny lunar volcanic crater in the southeastern part of the Mare Serenitatis. It is located to the northeast of the small crater Dawes, and to the west of the Montes Taurus range. To the east-northeast of this position is the landing site of the Apollo 17 mission, in the Taurus–Littrow valley.

Osiris and nearby Isis are located on conical uprises situated along a rille and are interpreted as small volcanic cones. Osiris is the biggest of 5 cones on this rille.

The name of the crater was approved by the IAU in 1976, and refers to an Egyptian male given name.
