= Lunar GNSS Receiver Experiment =

Lunar GNSS navigation experiment

Lunar GNSS Receiver Experiment (LuGRE) has been a joint NASA and Italian Space Agency (ASI) technology demonstration designed to evaluate the use of Global Navigation Satellite System (GNSS) signals—such as GPS and Galileo—for positioning, navigation, and timing (PNT) in cislunar space and on the Moon.

It has been the first mission to demonstrate acquisition, tracking, and navigation using Earth-based GNSS signals at lunar distance and on the lunar surface. The experiment has publicly provided an in situ demonstration of GNSS-based navigation beyond Earth orbit, extending prior theoretical and high-altitude studies into the lunar environment.

== Background ==
Global Navigation Satellite Systems (GNSSs), including the United States' GPS and the European Union's Galileo, are primarily designed for terrestrial applications. For this purpose, most of their satellites orbit at approximately 8,000 km and have antennas pointed towards the Earth's surface. However, their accurate positioning signals are valuable not only on the earth's surface, but also in space.

In the low Earth orbit, GNSS receivers do not need much modification compared to on land, and accordingly altitudes less than 3,000 km is considered to fall into the terrestrial service volume (TSV). Between 3,000 km and 8,000 km is the lower space service volume (SSV), where receivers can still be illuminated by the main lobe of the satellites, but need to deal with the signal coming from a wider range of directions in space as well as higher Doppler shifts. At the upper SSV (8,000–36000 km: below the GEO), receivers need to make do with the "spillover" of main lobe signal (i.e. the part not shadowed by Earth) and the much weaker (15 - 20 dB) side-lobe signals as well as deal with periods of no coverage. Despite all these difficulties, the GNSS SSV is increasingly well-understood.

Further extension of the GNSS service into high Earth orbit and cislunar space—and therefore beyond the Space Service Volume—has been studied for decades. Previous missions such as the Magnetospheric Multiscale mission demonstrated GNSS tracking at high altitudes approaching half the Earth–Moon distance.

Analytical and simulation studies have suggested that GNSS-based navigation at the Moon is feasible under weak-signal conditions.

== Mission, instrumentation, and data ==
=== Mission overview ===

LuGRE was flown aboard Blue Ghost Mission 1, a lunar lander developed by Firefly Aerospace under NASA's Commercial Lunar Payload Services (CLPS) program. The mission launched in January 2025 and landed on the Moon in March 2025. The experiment was jointly designed and developed under a bilateral agreement between NASA and ASI. The payload was designed and developed by Qascom s.r.l. while NASA and the Department of Electronics and Telecommunications of Politecnico di Torino were responsible for the scientific investigations, data analysis and dissemination.

Since January 15, 2025 to March 16 2025, the LuGRE payload was successfully operated during 26 operational windows of varying durations, during post-launch commissioning, transit operations in the Earth phasing loops, in lunar orbit, and on lunar surface.

=== Experiment objectives ===
LuGRE was conceived to achieve the following objectives:

1. Receive GNSS signals at the Moon, return data and characterize the lunar GNSS signal environment
2. Demonstrate navigation and time estimation using GNSS data collected at the Moon
3. Utilize collected data to support development of GNSS receivers specific to lunar use

=== Instrumentation ===
The payload included a gimballed high-gain antenna (pointed towards Earth), a low-noise amplifier, and a space-qualified, multi-constellation GNSS receiver capable of tracking GNSS signals in multiple frequency bands (i.e., L1/E1 and L5/E5a).

=== Collected data ===
The receiver was capable of tracking GPS and Galileo signals in multiple frequency bands (L1/E1 and L5/E5a) and produced standard GNSS observables such as code pseudorange, Doppler shift, and carrier phase. When sufficient signals were available, the system also generated onboard position, velocity, and time solutions. In addition to GNSS observables, the instrument recorded raw signal samples for post-processing and scientific analysis. These data, together with the GNSS observables, were downlinked to Earth and later publicly released for scientific analysis.

== Results ==
LuGRE is reported to have achieved the following milestones:

- First GNSS signal tracking in lunar orbit (February 14)
- First GNSS signal tracking on the lunar surface (March 3)
- First GNSS-based navigation fix on the lunar surface (March 3), 356,237 km from Earth surface
- Farthest GNSS signal tracking from Earth (March 16 22:36:17 UTC), 433,220 km from Earth surface
- Farthest GNSS-based navigation fix from Earth (March 16), 398,350 km from Earth surface

These results demonstrated that GNSS signals can be received and possibly used for navigation at lunar distance, potentially enabling more autonomous spacecraft operations and supporting future lunar navigation systems.

LuGRE proved able to track main-lobe and side-lobe signals (the latter at their peaks). Because of poor satellite geometry (all the satellites are approximately from the same angle), the dilution of precision was high. A few cases of radio occultation were observed in the data.

During additional analysis, the raw signal samples were found to contain usable signals from systems other than GPS and Galileo, including BeiDou (B1C, B2aD), NavIC (L1, L5), QZSS (L1, L5I), and various L1 SBAS. Future experiments could make use of these signals to gain more continuous GNSS coverage.
