= Isis (lunar crater) =

Crater on the Moon

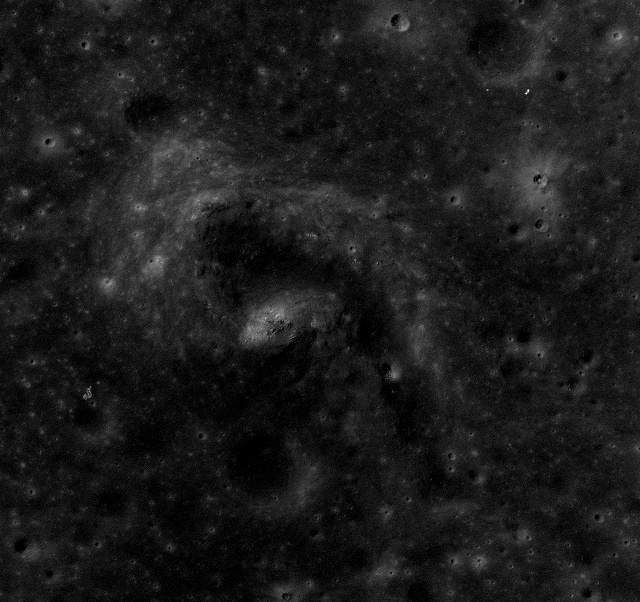
- Oblique Apollo 17 image, facing south
- Coordinates: 18.95°N 27.48°E
- Diameter: 0.61 km
- Colongitude: 323° at sunrise
- Eponym: Isis, Egyptian female given name

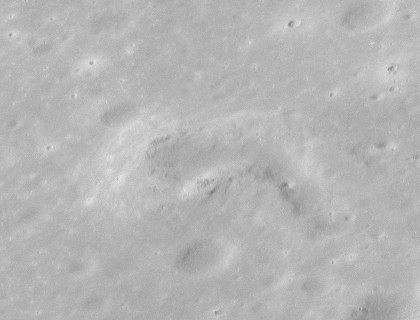
Oblique view from Apollo 15

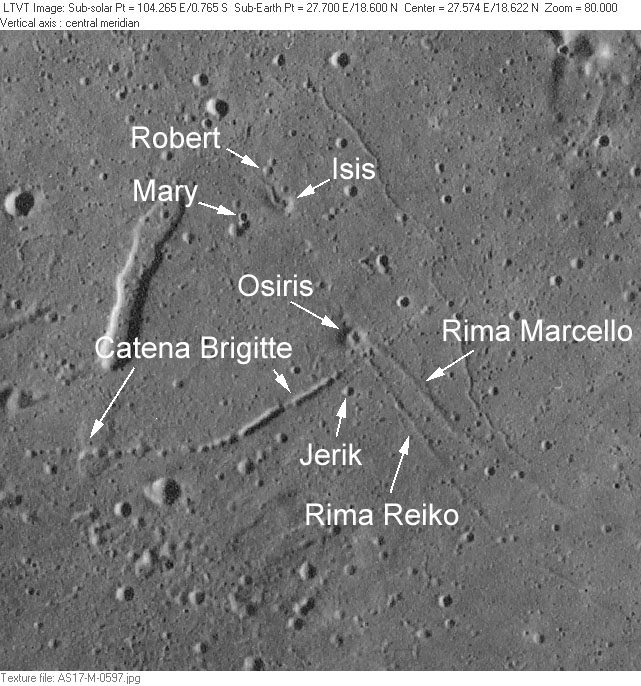
View from Apollo 17

Isis is a tiny lunar volcanic crater in the southeastern part of the Mare Serenitatis. It is located to the northeast of the small crater Dawes, and to the west of the Montes Taurus range. To the east-northeast of this position is the landing site of the Apollo 17 mission, in the Taurus–Littrow valley.

Isis and nearby Osiris are located on conical uprises situated along a rille and are interpreted as small volcanic cones.

The name of the crater was approved by the IAU in 1976, and refers to an Egyptian female given name.
