= Dawes (lunar crater) =

Lunar impact crater

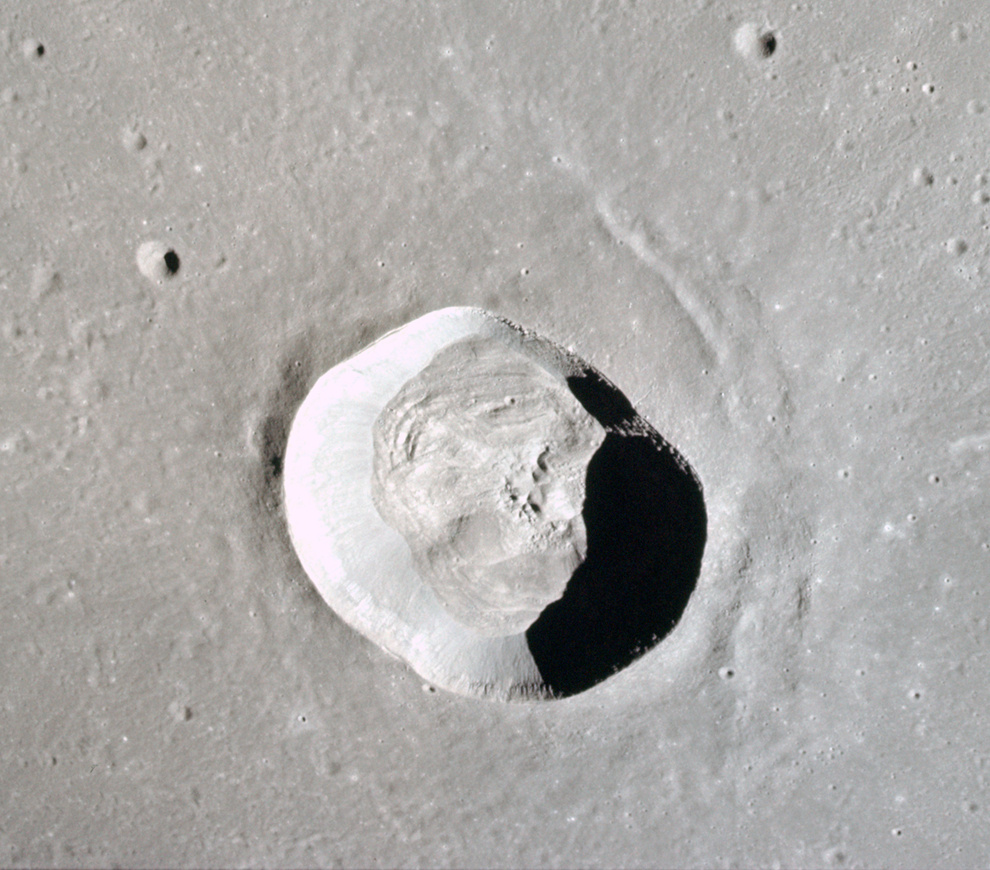
- Dawes from Apollo 17. NASA photo.
- Coordinates: 17.21°N 26.34°E
- Diameter: 17.6 km (10.9 mi)
- Depth: 2.44 km (1.52 mi)
- Colongitude: 334° at sunrise
- Formation: Copernican
- Eponym: William R. Dawes

Dawes is a lunar impact crater located in the wide straight between Mare Serenitatis and Mare Tranquilitatis. To its southwest lies the larger crater Plinius, and just to its northeast sits the Mons Argaeus mountain rise. Several instances of lunar transient phenomenon have been reported in association with this crater.

This crater is named after British astronomer William Rutter Dawes (1799-1868). His name was included with the lunar nomenclature of William R. Birt and John Lee during the 19th century. Its designation was officially adopted by the International Astronomical Union in 1935.

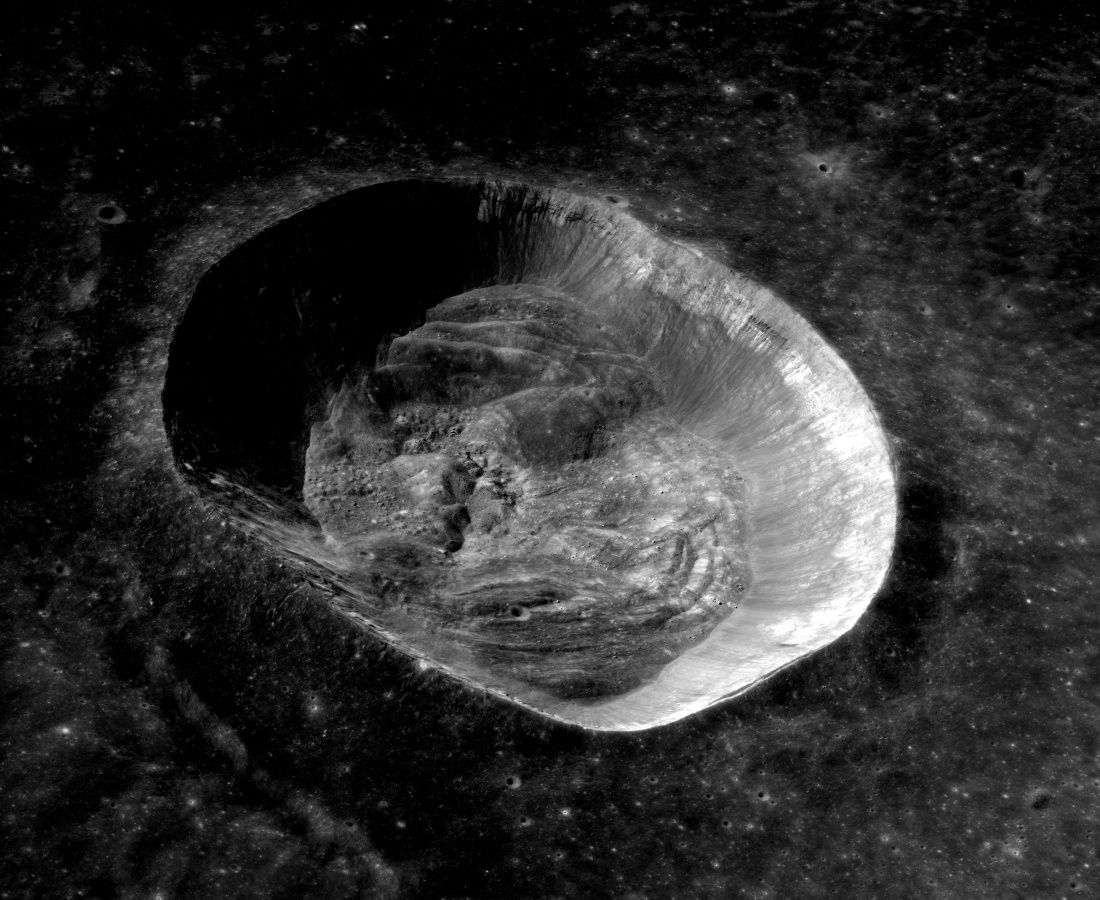
Oblique view facing south from Apollo 17

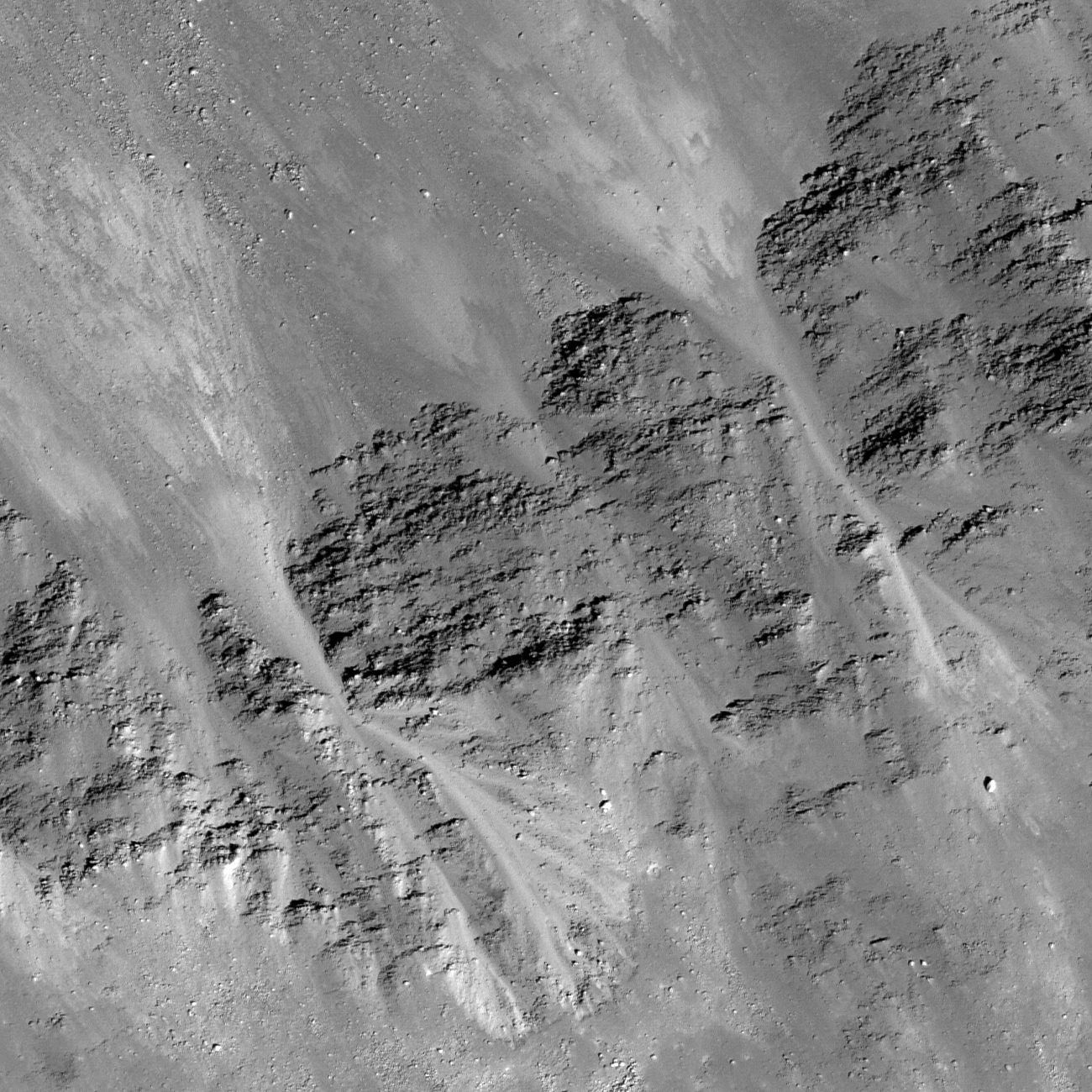
Layers of mare basalt affected the paths of granular material that flowed down the crater wall. The top of the image is down-slope. From LRO.

== Description ==
This formation dates to 454+171
−132 Ma ago, which places it in the Copernican period on the lunar geologic timescale. Dawes is circular with a sharp rim that has a slightly flattened oval perimeter. It has a slight central rise, and a somewhat darker floor that is nearly covered in overlapping swirl-like deposits. There is a pair of darker streaks running from the central peak up the west wall. Much of the deposits are slumped or fall-back material. The inner walls are steep and free from impact erosion. Just northeast of Dawes is a rille known as Rima Dawes.

Detailed examination of this crater has located what appear to be alcoves and channels along the inner rim. It is hypothesized that micrometeorite impacts along the rim trigger dry landslides, which produce a gully-like appearance. A similar phenomenon may be responsible for gully-like features along the inner rim of some Martian craters.

This formation is located 140 km (87 mi) from the Apollo 17 landing site. Spectra of rocks on the crater floor of Dawes appear comparable to shocked norites found by the lander crew in the Taurus-Littrow valley, suggesting they may be crater ejecta from that impact.
